Proposition 218 is an adopted initiative constitutional amendment which revolutionized local and regional government finance and taxation in California. Named the "Right to Vote on Taxes Act," it was sponsored by the Howard Jarvis Taxpayers Association as a constitutional follow-up to the landmark property tax reduction initiative constitutional amendment, Proposition 13, approved in 1978. Proposition 218 was approved and adopted by California voters during the November 5, 1996, statewide general election.

Proposition 218 amended the California Constitution by adding Article XIII C and Article XIII D. Article XIII C added constitutional voter approval requirements for all local government taxes which previously did not exist. Also included in Article XIII C is a provision significantly expanding the constitutional local initiative power by voters to reduce or repeal any local government tax, assessment, fee or charge, and this provision is subject to a significantly reduced signature requirement making ballot qualification easier. Article XIII D added constitutional assessment and property-related fee reforms applicable to all local governments which also previously did not exist. This includes numerous additional requirements for special benefit assessments on real property as well as numerous requirements for property-related fees and charges, such as utility fees imposed by local governments which are no longer allowed to exceed the cost of providing the utility service.

The California Senate Office of Research listed Proposition 218 as one of the most significant laws of the 20th century in California.  Following the November 1996 election, a high level official from the California State Association of Counties wrote that Proposition 218 "profoundly changes the way California is governed" and "may prove to be the most revolutionary act in the history of California." Proposition 218 was also the first successful initiative constitutional amendment in California history to add more than one article to the California Constitution as well as to alter the scope of the constitutional initiative power. The measure was drafted by constitutional attorneys Jonathan Coupal and Jack Cohen.

General Information 

The official legal title of Proposition 218 was: "Voter Approval for Local Government Taxes. Limitations on Fees, Assessments, and Charges. Initiative Constitutional Amendment."

The Findings and Declarations provision contained in Proposition 218 stated that: "The people of the State of California hereby find and declare that Proposition 13 was intended to provide effective tax relief and to require voter approval of tax increases. However, local governments have subjected taxpayers to excessive tax, assessment, fee and charge increases that not only frustrate the purposes of voter approval for tax increases, but also threaten the economic security of all Californians and the California economy itself. This measure protects taxpayers by limiting the methods by which local governments exact revenue from taxpayers without their consent."

Conditions Leading to Proposition 218 

The special assessment and property-related fee reforms contained in Proposition 218 were a response to fiscal conservatives' views of local taxation practices in the 1980s and 1990s following the passage of Proposition 13. After Proposition 13 passed in 1978, local governments sought methods to raise additional revenues and avoid the two-thirds voter approval requirement for special taxes under Proposition 13.

Proposition 218 proponents claimed that local governments discovered a particularly pernicious way to raise additional revenues and avoid the Proposition 13 two-thirds local voter approval requirement for taxes by using special assessment districts. Special assessments on real property became a vehicle of choice for local politicians seeking to avoid difficult government spending decisions.

The property assessment loophole floodgates opened wide following a controversial 1992 California Supreme Court decision (known as the Knox case) holding that the two-thirds voter approval requirement for local special taxes under Proposition 13 did not apply to special benefit assessments on real property.

As a result of the Knox decision, local governments could legally impose special assessments on real property for a wide range of purposes without voter approval. Special assessments effectively became unrestricted property tax increases appearing on the property tax bills of millions of California property owners. There were no legal limits on how high special assessments could go, or how many special assessments could be imposed on a parcel of private property.

Once the special assessment loophole following the Knox decision was created, one lawyer working with local government politicians wrote that property assessments in California "are now limited only by the limits of human imagination." Some of the more imaginative special assessments imposed by local governments included: (1) A "view tax" in southern California – the better the view of the ocean the property owner had, the more the owner paid; (2) In northern California, property owners 27 miles away from a park were assessed because their property allegedly specially benefited from that park.

Controversial property-related fees and charges also became a significant problem following the passage of Proposition 13, as many local governments labeled taxes as "fees" or "charges" and imposed them without voter approval. For example, the California Supreme Court ruled that a local municipal utility, such as a city providing domestic water service, is entitled to a reasonable "return on investment" (otherwise referred to as "profit"). As a result, a local municipal utility could legally overcharge its customers in excess of the cost of providing the utility service to its customers, and then transfer the excess cost revenues to the general fund of the local agency to be spent at the discretion of local politicians. All this could generally be done without voter approval.

Proposition 218 Election Campaign 

Proposition 218 was considered a sleeper measure by the media as local governments were legally prohibited from using public funds and other resources to campaign against it, and because greater media attention had been given to the Proposition 209 ban on affirmative action and the Proposition 215 medical marijuana initiative measures which also appeared on the same election ballot.

Proposition 218 was initially estimated to cost local governments in California at least $100 million per year with long-term cost estimates being much greater in the many billions of dollars per year, and Moody's Investors Service warned the initiative measure would cause "significantly declining credit quality." The credit ratings issue became so heated during the Proposition 218 election campaign that the California State Treasurer, in an effort to calm the municipal bond market, took the extraordinary step of warning measure opponents against exaggerating the possible negative impacts on local government credit ratings and bond issuances when discussing Proposition 218.

Like Proposition 13 in 1978, Proposition 218 was also opposed by the vast majority of prominent newspapers and the political establishment in California. Opposition to Proposition 218 included public employee unions, local governments, local government interest organizations, environmental interest groups, public education interest groups, and private business firms that underwrite municipal bonds.

Of the total campaign contributions received against Proposition 218, 74% came from public employee unions, and those interests contributing $10,000 or more represented 91% of the total contributions received by the Proposition 218 opposition campaign.

Also similar to Proposition 13, there were dire predictions from the measure opponents, especially local politicians, regarding what would happen if Proposition 218 were to be approved by the voters. Some examples included: Expensive landscaping would die and become fodder for devastating fires. Silicon Valley would be shut down forever. Parks, senior centers, and other public buildings would shut down. Neighborhoods would no longer be safe. The initiative would immediately have a devastating effect on local government finance. The initiative would force local governments to go back decades and destroy their method of service delivery. The initiative would be a mortal threat to fire safety.

The supporters of Proposition 218 focused on the primary benefit that voters would have the constitutional right to vote on local government taxes. Proposition 218 supporters also urged voters to review their property tax bill which would confirm the growing list of property-related fees, charges and special assessments imposed by local governments without voter approval.

Election Results and Summary Statistics 

Proposition 218 passed with 56.55% support statewide, representing a margin of victory of 13.1 percentage points.

Proposition 218 passed in 54 (93%) of the 58 counties in California.

Proposition 218 passed in 405 (86%) of the 469 cities in California in 1996.

Proposition 218 passed in 67 (84%) of the 80 State Assembly Districts and in 34 (85%) of the 40 State Senate Districts in California (based on 2011 Redistricting). This means that Proposition 218 passed in the overwhelming majority of state legislative districts in California without regard to the political party representation in those districts. 

Proposition 218 received 62% support in the 26 California counties with a Republican voter registration advantage and 54% support in the 32 California counties with a Democratic voter registration advantage during the November 1996 statewide election.

What made the Proposition 218 victory so unusual was that it was behind in nearly all the polls, including final polls just before the election. Polling from the Proposition 218 opposition campaign revealed the measure was expected to lose by about 15 percentage points. Proposition 218 was also significantly behind in the final Field Poll with only 36% support from likely voters. Proposition 218 ended up winning by 13 percentage points. The large variation between the final polling numbers and the election results was a politically rare event for statewide initiative measures in California.

Article XIII C – Local Government Taxes 

Section 3 of Proposition 218 added Article XIII C to the California Constitution. Article XIII C relates primarily to local government taxes, including applicable voter approval requirements.

Section 1 of Article XIII C contains definitions applicable to the article.  Section 1 also defines the types of taxes local governments may levy. A "general tax" is defined as any tax imposed for general governmental purposes. A "special tax" is defined as any tax imposed for specific purposes, including a tax imposed for specific purposes which is placed into a general fund. The general versus special tax distinction existed in California prior to Proposition 218, but Proposition 218 contains a broader definition of "special tax" as also including taxes imposed for specific purposes that are placed into a general fund.

Section 1 definitions also include the term "local government" setting forth the various public entities subject to the article. The term "local government" for purposes of Proposition 218 is very broadly defined to counter a previously narrow interpretation given by the California Supreme Court under Proposition 13 which created loopholes allowing some local governments to circumvent constitutional two-thirds voter approval requirements for local taxes. Government entities subject to Proposition 218 provisions are local and regional governments, including counties, cities, a city and county, school districts, community college districts, public authorities, joint powers agencies, and special districts such as water or fire districts. The "local government" definition also expressly states that it includes charter cities having a local charter (similar to a local constitution) as their primary source of government powers and authority.

If a local government tax is legally dedicated for one or more specific purposes it is a special tax. Proposition 218 also requires certain taxes relating to real property (e.g., parcel taxes) be levied as special taxes. Proposition 218 further specifies that many local governments, including school districts, do not have the power to levy general taxes which means that such local governments (known as special purpose districts or agencies) can only legally levy special taxes.

To the extent a local government has the power to levy a general tax and that a particular tax is not required to be levied as a special tax, a tax is general only when its revenues are placed into the general fund of the local government and are available for expenditure for any and all governmental purposes.

"Tax" Definition and Proposition 26 (2010) 

During the November 2010 General Election, California voters passed Proposition 26 which, in part, added a broad constitutional definition of "tax" for purposes of Proposition 218. Proposition 218 did not include a specific constitutional definition of "tax," but California courts, prior to the passage of Proposition 26 in 2010, generally broadly construed what constitutes a "tax" such as concluding that a 911 "fee" was really a special tax subject to two-thirds voter approval.

If a local government levy, charge or exaction is a "tax" under the Proposition 26 constitutional definition, then voter approval is required under Proposition 218 if that tax is a new tax, an increased tax, or a tax extension. A local government levy that is not a tax under Proposition 26 may nonetheless be subject to Proposition 218 constitutional provisions under Article XIII D if the levy is either a special assessment on real property or a property-related fee or charge.

Local government fees and charges that are neither taxes under Proposition 26 nor subject to Article XIII D are generally subject to reduction or repeal using the local initiative power under Proposition 218, including the significantly reduced signature requirement thereunder. This gives local voters a legislative remedy to require an election concerning a nontax levy approved by a local government where an election is not legally required by Proposition 218 or any other provision of law.

One example is a fee on the extraction of groundwater.  In 2017, the California Supreme Court held that a fee imposed upon persons on the extraction of groundwater is no longer a property-related fee under Proposition 218, although such fees remain subject to Proposition 26 provisions defining when a local levy is a tax.

Voter Approval Requirements and Related Provisions for Local Taxes 

Section 2 of Article XIII C contains the voter approval requirements for local government taxes. Under Proposition 218, every local government tax is either a general tax or a special tax. Proposition 218 does not allow a local tax to be a hybrid tax. The type of tax a local government levies (whether general or special) is legally significant because it determines the applicable voter approval requirement.

Special purpose districts or agencies, including school districts, have no power to levy general taxes and can only impose special taxes. This restriction is based on prior judicial interpretations of Proposition 13 which Proposition 218 constitutionalized. Generally, only a city or a county has the power to levy a majority vote general tax under Proposition 218.

The voter approval requirement under Proposition 218 was upheld by a California appellate court in 1998 as not constituting an unconstitutional referendum.

The voter approval requirement for taxes under Proposition 218 is triggered when a local government "imposes," "extends," or "increases" a tax. What constitutes a tax "increase" under Proposition 218 was broadly construed by a California appellate court in 2007. The applicable electorate for conducting a local tax election is generally the registered voters of the local government.

New Taxes 

New local government taxes require voter approval under Proposition 218. The term "imposed" for purposes of triggering the voter approval requirement under Proposition 218 typically refers to the first enactment of a tax.

Tax Increase 

When local governments "increase" a local tax, voter approval is required under Proposition 218. The California Legislature adopted a statute interpreting the term "increase" for purposes of Proposition 218 although the courts have the final say in interpreting the applicable constitutional language.

A tax is "increased" under Proposition 218 when a local government makes a decision that does any of the following: (1) increases any applicable rate used to calculate the tax; or (2) revises the methodology by which the tax is calculated, if that revision results in an increased amount being levied on any person or parcel of property. The term "methodology" refers to a mathematical equation for calculating taxes that is officially sanctioned by a local government. In practical terms, a tax is "increased" under Proposition 218 if the math behind it is altered so that either a larger tax rate or a larger tax base is part of the calculation.

An example application of the foregoing to an unresolved legal issue is when utility rates are increased in local governments having a related utility users tax. A utility rate increase can also result in increased utility user tax payments and revenues for the benefit of the local government. A properly levied utility rate increase can be applied for purposes of generating increased utility revenues, but if those increased utility rates are also applied for purposes of generating increased utility user tax revenues, that might be a tax "increase" and trigger the voter approval requirement under Proposition 218.

Tax Extension 

When a local government "extends" a local tax, voter approval is required under Proposition 218. The California Legislature adopted a statute narrowly interpreting the term "extended" for purposes of the tax provisions of Proposition 218. However, the courts have the final say in interpreting the applicable constitutional language.

A tax is "extended" for purposes of Proposition 218 when, as applied to an existing tax, a local government extends the stated effective period for the tax, including, but not limited to, amendment or removal of a sunset provision or expiration date. The term "extend" as applied to a tax has been interpreted not to apply to geographic areas in certain annexation proceedings. While expanding the geographic area subject to a tax may not constitute an "extension," it may constitute a tax "increase" and thereby require voter approval under Proposition 218 on that basis.

Tax Modernization  

Some local governments have combined in the same ballot measure a minor tax reduction (which does not require voter approval) with a tax base expansion that does require voter approval under Proposition 218 because it is considered a tax increase. This is often done with utility user tax "modernization" measures with the nominal tax rate reduction component serving to make the tax more politically attractive to voters. When such a ballot measure is presented to voters, the full text of the measure should be reviewed so that voters will be more fully informed about the specifics of the tax proposal, particularly as it relates to any expansion of the tax base which is the legal reason why the tax appears on the ballot for voter approval.

Controversy also exists whether utility user tax "modernization" measures permit local governments to impose taxes on online video streaming services. With regard to previously approved "modernization" measures, voters may have unknowingly authorized the imposition of taxes on online video streaming services. This places greater emphasis on the need for voters to carefully review the text of any tax modernization measure to determine whether taxes on online video streaming services would be authorized. To the extent that previously approved tax modernization measures are interpreted to include taxes on online video streaming services, voters have an available legislative remedy using the local initiative power under Proposition 218 to reduce or repeal any tax on online video streaming services.

General Tax Vote Requirement 

Under Article XIII C, a local government may not impose, extend, or increase any general tax unless the tax is first submitted to the electorate and approved by a majority vote. Proposition 218 requires that general tax elections be consolidated with a regularly scheduled general election for members of the governing body of the local government, except in cases of an emergency declared by a unanimous vote of the governing body. The California Supreme Court construed the election consolidation requirement to not apply when a general tax is proposed by the voters exercising the local initiative power.

Some local governments, in an effort to accelerate the election date for a general tax measure, have invoked the emergency exception applicable to the election consolidation requirement under questionable circumstances. When this occurs, often the only practical remedy available to voters is to make the emergency exception controversy a political issue during the election campaign, especially since significant additional special election costs are incurred as a result of invoking the emergency exception.

Since general taxes are not legally dedicated for specific purposes, they can be spent at the complete discretion of local politicians, including on public employee salaries and benefits.

Some local governments in an effort to evade the two-thirds voter approval requirement for special taxes under Proposition 218 may express legally nonbinding intent to spend general tax proceeds for one or more specific purposes. This may be done in several forms such as the adoption of intent language before the tax election date, the formation of an advisory committee relating to the expenditure of the tax proceeds, or by placing a companion advisory measure on the same election ballot.  Use of a companion advisory measure associated with an unrestricted local tax measure was found by one California appellate court to be a general tax notwithstanding the expanded special tax definition under Proposition 218.

Controversial general tax measures intended for one or more specific purposes also have the effect of circumventing California accountability laws designed to protect taxpayers by ensuring that local government taxes imposed for specific purposes are actually spent as set forth in the ballot measure.

Local governments also sometimes refer to a general tax as a "vital services" tax in order to make the tax more politically attractive to voters. A true general tax under Proposition 218 can be spent on public services or programs that are not deemed "vital" by a local government. This can include controversial purposes such as financing high public employee salaries and benefits or paying for excessive public employee pension obligations.

General tax proceeds placed into the general fund of a local government may generally not be subsequently pledged to repay bonded indebtedness. A general tax must be available for expenditure for any and all governmental purposes in order to remain a valid general tax.

When a controversial general tax measure is presented by a local government, often the only practical remedy available to voters is to make the controversial tax measure a political issue during the election campaign. The Howard Jarvis Taxpayers Association has published various "taxpayer tools" to assist taxpayers in situations such as when a controversial general tax measure is placed on the ballot by a local government.

Special Tax Vote Requirement 

A local government may not impose, extend, or increase any special tax unless that tax is first submitted to the electorate and approved by a two-thirds vote. Proposition 218 contains an additional requirement that any tax subject to voter approval assessed upon a parcel of real property or upon a person as an incident of real property ownership must be a special tax subject to two-thirds voter approval. As a practical matter, this means all parcel taxes (taxes on real property not based on the assessed value of the property) must be levied as special taxes subject to two-thirds voter approval.

Application of Proposition 218 Tax Restrictions to Local Initiatives 

In California Cannabis Coalition v. City of Upland, 3 Cal. 5th 924 (August 2017), the California Supreme Court in a controversial 5–2 split decision held that the election consolidation requirement applicable to general taxes under Proposition 218 does not apply to a local tax initiative placed on the ballot by the electorate exercising the local initiative power. The majority opinion was written by former Justice Mariano-Florentino Cuéllar, and the dissenting opinion was written by Justice Leondra Kruger.

The California Cannabis Coalition decision has raised legal questions concerning whether the voter approval requirements for local taxes under Proposition 218 also apply to a local tax initiative placed on the ballot by the electorate exercising the local initiative power. However, the California Cannabis Coalition case did not involve the voter approval requirements under Proposition 218, but rather involved a narrow election timing issue (the election consolidation requirement) applicable only to general taxes which under Proposition 218 may only be levied by cities or counties in California.

A Proposition 218 specialist law firm representing local governments in California concluded that the California Cannabis Coalition case was a narrow decision that "leaves the two-thirds-voter-approval requirement for local taxes in place and makes only a very modest change to earlier understandings of Proposition 218 and the law of initiatives." In support of the foregoing conclusion, the analysis stated: "The Court goes on, however, to make clear the two-thirds-voter-approval requirement for special taxes – taxes which may be spent only for a stated purpose – does apply to initiatives: 'In article XIII C, section 2, subdivision (d), for example, the enactors adopted a requirement providing that, before a local government can impose, extend, or increase any special tax, voters must approve the tax by a two-thirds vote. That constitutes a higher vote requirement than would otherwise apply. ... That the voters explicitly imposed a procedural two-thirds vote requirement on themselves in article XIII C, section 2, subdivision (d) is evidence that they did not implicitly impose a procedural timing requirement in subdivision (b).'"

Although the California Cannabis Coalition decision was narrow, it has been heavily criticized because in an effort to grant deference to the local initiative power, "the court erred in the opposite direction by adopting an overly narrow reading of Proposition 218." Another article noted: "The court's decision represents a ridiculously narrow vision of what was intended by Proposition 218." Proposition 218 constitutionally requires that its provisions be "liberally construed to effectuate its purposes of limiting local government revenue and enhancing taxpayer consent." The California Supreme Court also previously stated that the constitutional provisions of Proposition 218 are of dignity at least equal to other provisions of the California Constitution. In addition, Proposition 218 also makes it expressly clear with prefacing language that its constitutional requirements applicable to taxes shall apply "[n]otwithstanding any other provision of this Constitution." The local initiative power is provided for in an "other provision of this Constitution." None of the foregoing were referenced in the majority opinion in the California Cannabis Coalition case.

On October 13, 2017, then California Governor Brown signed Assembly Bill No. 765 into law which repealed the initiative special election statutory provision (Section 9214 of the California Elections Code) that was at issue in the California Cannabis Coalition case.

While the California Cannabis Coalition decision applied only to the election timing requirement for general taxes under Proposition 218, in Altadena Library District v. Bloodgood, 192 Cal. App. 3d 585 (June 1987) the two-thirds voter approval requirement for special taxes under Proposition 13, a different and older constitutional taxpayer protection provision, has previously been applied (before the passage of Proposition 218) to a local initiative tax increase proposed by the electorate exercising the local initiative power. That constitutional two-thirds voter approval requirement under Proposition 13 is independent of subsequent Proposition 218 tax restrictions. The California Cannabis Coalition decision did not disapprove or otherwise disturb the 1987 Altadena Library District appellate court decision.

In addition, in Howard Jarvis Taxpayers Association v. City of San Diego, 120 Cal. App. 4th 374, 390–394 (July 2004) Proposition 218 voter approval tax restrictions were previously applied to invalidate a local initiative measure approved by the electorate exercising the local initiative power that would have required two-thirds voter approval for any general tax proposed by the San Diego City Council, instead of the majority vote approval required under Proposition 218. The California Cannabis Coalition decision did not disapprove or otherwise disturb the 2004 City of San Diego appellate court decision.

Local Initiative Power to Reduce or Repeal Majority Vote Special Taxes 

Following the decision in California Cannabis Coalition, to the extent a local tax increase initiative evades the constitutional two-thirds voter approval requirement for special taxes under Proposition 13 and/or Proposition 218, as a legislative remedy that tax may be reduced or repealed by the local electorate using the local initiative power under Proposition 218, including the significantly reduced signature requirement thereunder. This can be done as an alternative to, or concurrent with, any legal remedy for noncompliance with any applicable voter approval requirements under Proposition 13 and/or Proposition 218.

Legal Authority to Impose Local Taxes 

Proposition 218 does not legally authorize any local government to impose any tax. The legal authority to levy a local government tax (known as tax enabling authority) must come from an independent legal source such as a statute enacted by the California Legislature, and may be subject to additional statutory restrictions. The California Supreme Court has held that a local government must comply with any applicable statutory requirements as well as the constitutional requirements under Proposition 218.

An example of an additional statutory restriction is a supermajority vote requirement of the governing body of the local government to place a local tax measure on the ballot. Another example of an additional statutory restriction is that many parcel taxes must be applied uniformly to all taxpayers or real property.

Temporary vs. Permanent Taxes 

Under Proposition 218, taxes proposed by a local government may either be temporary or permanent. If a tax is temporary, voter approval is required to extend a tax beyond its expiration date. Permanent local government taxes continue for an indefinite period of time. However, permanent taxes can generally be reduced or repealed by either subsequent action of the local governing body itself or by the voters exercising the local initiative power under Proposition 218.

Historically, some ballot questions did not expressly specify the duration of a tax, including if a proposed tax would be permanent. In such situations, either the impartial ballot measure summary and/or the full text of the tax measure specified the duration of a proposed tax. However, effective January 1, 2018, if a proposed local government measure imposes a tax or raises the rate of a tax, the ballot must specify the duration of the tax to be levied. 

The Howard Jarvis Taxpayers Association states that some local governments, in an effort to increase the chances of passing a tax, will initially propose a temporary tax instead of a permanent tax. The general strategy is once a temporary tax passes, it will then be easier for the local government to either extend or increase an already existing tax in the future. Based on historical election statistics, once local government voters pass a "temporary" tax, it is generally easier to obtain subsequent voter approval for a tax extension or a tax increase. The Howard Jarvis Taxpayers Association also states that local governments rarely allow temporary taxes to expire on their own without at least an effort to extend and/or increase the tax, and that voters should assume that any proposed temporary tax will not end at the specified expiration date, but will instead either be extended for an additional period of years or be made permanent.

Issues Related to Proposition 218 Elections 

Local governments frequently conduct opinion polling of their voters before deciding whether to place a local tax measure on the ballot. Opinion polls may also be conducted with other revenue sources requiring an election under Proposition 218 such as for a property-related fee or charge or an assessment on real property.

Spending public funds to conduct opinion polls is generally permissible under California law. The use of public funds to conduct opinion polling concerning a local tax proposal becomes more controversial when the poll also includes questions of a political nature ordinarily utilized in a subsequent election campaign (e.g., testing support and/or opposition arguments for use in a subsequent tax election campaign) as opposed to only providing information to local government officials to determine whether to place a tax measure on the ballot.

An opinion poll prepared by a local government is generally a "public record" whereby any member of the public may make a written request and receive a copy of the opinion poll under the California Public Records Act. Payment of a fee covering the direct costs of duplicating any requested pages from an opinion poll may also be required.

California courts have generally been lenient in allowing local governments to spend public funds associated with activities (such as conducting opinion polling) before a tax proposal is placed on the ballot. Some voters may question the appropriateness of local governments spending public funds on opinion polling in connection with a local tax measure, especially if the polling results are later used for political purposes during the election campaign to increase the chances of a local tax being approved by the voters. If this occurs, often the only practical remedy available to voters is to make the matter a political issue during the tax measure election campaign which can lower the chances of the local tax measure being approved by the voters.

Local Government "Informational" Campaigns in Local Tax Elections 

Local governments are legally prohibited from spending public funds and other resources to campaign in support of tax measures required to be submitted to the voters under Proposition 218, but local governments are allowed to spend public funds to engage in "informational" campaigns that educate voters about such tax measures. California courts have generally been lenient in allowing local governments to engage in informational campaigns in connection with local tax measures. Some voters may question the appropriateness of local governments spending taxpayer funds on such informational campaigns, particularly when the intent and practical effect of these informational campaigns is to increase the chances of a local tax measure being approved by the voters. When questionable or controversial informational campaigns occur, often the only practical remedy available is to make such informational campaigns a political issue during the tax measure political campaign which can lower the chances of the local tax measure being approved by voters.

The Howard Jarvis Taxpayers Association has released a document to assist taxpayers in matters relating to campaign spending by local governments.

Ballot Questions in Local Tax Elections 

Local governments in California are generally allowed to write the ballot question for tax elections required under Proposition 218. The ballot question is the actual text that appears on the election ballot when voters cast their vote on a tax measure. How the ballot question is written can affect the outcome of a tax election. Issues often arise concerning the impartiality of ballot questions prepared by local governments that support tax measures they submit to the voters.

California courts have generally allowed local governments significant leeway in preparing tax election ballot questions. Ballot questions can sometimes be misleading to many voters or may include incomplete information regarding the specifics of a tax measure. Local governments also sometimes "poll test" their ballot questions in an effort to further increase the chances of passing a tax measure. This process involves conducting polling before officially calling an election to determine the specific ballot measure language that yields the highest level of voter support.

When controversial ballot questions are prepared by local governments, often the only practical remedy available to voters is to make the controversial ballot question a political issue during the tax measure political campaign, including informing voters about the specifics of the ballot controversy.

Effective January 1, 2018, if a proposed local government measure imposes a tax or raises the rate of a tax, the ballot must include in the statement of the measure to be voted on the amount of money to be raised annually, the rate of the tax, and the duration of the tax to be levied. The statement of the tax measure must be a true and impartial synopsis of the purpose of the proposed tax measure, and must be in language that is neither argumentative nor likely to create prejudice for or against the tax measure. The statement requirement applies regardless of whether the tax measure is proposed by the local governing body or is submitted to the local voters as an initiative or referendum measure.

Local Politicians "Letting the Voters Decide" 

The voter approval requirements for local taxes under Proposition 218 are legally mandatory. Thus, local politicians place tax measures on the ballot for voter approval not by a voluntary choice in support of protecting local taxpayers, but rather in response to the constitutional mandates of Proposition 218.

In addition, when local politicians vote to place a local tax measure on the ballot, they are also approving that tax on the merits. This is typically done in the form of a local ordinance or resolution approving the tax. However, the tax approval does not become effective unless and until approved by the voters.

Local politicians sometimes claim they are merely "letting the voters decide" when they vote on a tax proposal that would levy a new tax, a tax increase, or a tax extension. However, this is generally done by local politicians in an effort to avoid political accountability for supporting a tax on the merits.

Voter Considerations in Local Proposition 218 Elections 

If a tax is proposed by a local government, it is important to consider the budgetary conditions that led to placing the tax measure on the ballot.

As public employee salary and benefit obligations increase over time, particularly with respect to pensions and public employee retiree healthcare, the impacts on the local government budget become more significant and can even lead to bankruptcy. Local politicians end up having to reduce public services and/or raise taxes or other revenues such as fees and charges. To the extent that taxes are raised, the tax proceeds will generally either directly or indirectly pay for public employee salary and benefit obligations. Research has shown that many local tax increases are concentrated in California communities that have the largest public employee pension problems.

Some local governments may also claim a lack of sufficient funding for priority programs and services such as public safety. This is intended to make a tax proposal more politically attractive.  However, the California Constitution mandates that the "protection of the public safety is the first responsibility of local government and local officials have an obligation to give priority to the provision of adequate public safety services." This constitutional obligation exists regardless of whether a local tax measure is approved by voters.

Some local government tax proposals may be relatively modest in amount, but when added to other taxes currently paid by taxpayers would result in a cumulative tax burden that may be unacceptably high. This is especially the case concerning regressive parcel taxes that disproportionately burden homeowners. Before voting on any local government property tax measure (including any local general obligation bond measure that also increases local property taxes to repay the bonds), it is considered a good practice by voters to review their current property tax bill to get a better picture of the cumulative impact of any property tax measure.

It is also not unusual for multiple tax proposals to appear on the same election ballot. This not only includes tax proposals from other local governments but sometimes even multiple tax proposals from the same local government. Multiple tax measures on the same ballot can sometimes lead to overwhelming tax burdens to the point where voters end up voting against all tax measures.

To avoid significantly higher levels of taxation than expected, voters also need to consider local tax proposals that are likely to appear on the ballot in the near future. Local governments frequently coordinate the scheduling of their tax elections to increase the chances of multiple tax measures passing over a short time period. For example, local tax measures may be placed on the ballot during a statewide primary election in coordination with other local governments placing their tax measures on a statewide general election occurring several months later. More patient local governments are also willing to wait another election cycle for a more favorable election date to increase the chances of passing a local tax. This is especially the case for presidential general elections where voters tend to be more inclined to support local taxes.

Passage of a local government tax measure also establishes political precedent that can often lead to additional and sometimes more expensive tax measures in the future by the same or other local governments in the area.

Voter Resources in Local Proposition 218 Elections 

The Howard Jarvis Taxpayers Association has published various "taxpayer tools" to assist taxpayers in situations where a tax measure has been placed on the ballot by a local government.

In Proposition 218 tax elections, it is often helpful to voters to have financial data regarding the local government proposing the tax so that voters can make a more informed voting decision concerning the merits and need for the tax. This includes the availability of comparative financial data with other local governments, including other local governments similar in population as well as geographical proximity.

Much of the financial data about a local government, including detailed budgetary data, can be obtained directly from the local government itself. In some instances, it may be necessary to make written requests under the California Public Records Act. It may also be advisable to obtain data in electronic format to facilitate further study and analysis. Additional information that is generally of value to voters includes public employee salary data, public employee benefits data (including pensions), annual audited financial reports, historical (prior years) budgetary data within the local government, and budgetary projections in future years. Budgetary spending decisions, which typically reflect the spending policies and priorities of a local government, can be particularly helpful in general tax elections where local politicians will decide how the tax proceeds will be spent.

The California Supreme Court has held that when a public official or employee uses a personal account and/or device to communicate about the conduct of public business, such as e-mails or text messages, the applicable writings may be subject to public disclosure under the California Public Records Act. Such communications may yield information relevant for voter consideration in Proposition 218 tax elections.

Large amounts of financial data concerning local governments in California are also available in digital format from state agencies, including the California State Controller, the California Department of Tax and Fee Administration, the California Secretary of State, and the California Department of Education.

Local government finance and budgetary data can also be of significant value to voters in connection with the exercise of the local initiative power under Proposition 218 to reduce or repeal local government levies. This includes for purposes of properly designing a tie-in initiative and for targeting alternative revenue sources for reduction or repeal utilizing a compensatory initiative. Such data can also be utilized to bolster findings and declarations in a local initiative under Proposition 218, especially in connection with local government utility fee reductions or repeals that may be subject to statutory utility rate restrictions under California law.

The California State Controller makes extensive and detailed local government financial data available on its Government Financial Reports Data website. The website has years of detailed financial data in an open data format from all California counties, most California cities, thousands of special districts, and pension-related information for state and local government pension plans. Detailed financial data provided about local governments include revenues, expenditures, liabilities, assets, and fund balances. The data are compiled from reports submitted by local governments to the California State Controller as required by law. The financial data are generally unaudited.

The California State Controller also makes extensive and detailed salary and other compensation (e.g., retirement and health costs) data for local government public employees in California on its Government Compensation in California website. Extensive tools are provided for data analysis and comparison purposes. Extensive and detailed California local government public employee salary (including benefits) and pension data are also available on the Transparent California website. The data are obtained from local governments pursuant to public record requests under the California Public Records Act.

The California Department of Tax and Fee Administration provides sales tax rates for local governments on its website. Current and historical tax rate data are provided. Tax rate data are also available for downloading to facilitate further study and analysis. The sales tax rate data are particularly useful to taxpayers and voters in local sales tax elections. Sales tax rate increases are being used more and more by local governments in California, especially cities, to fund government services, programs, infrastructure, and often high public employee salaries and benefits (including pension obligations). As a result, there exists significant variation in sales tax rates in local jurisdictions throughout California.

The California Department of Education provides detailed California K-12 public education data on the Ed-Data website. Student and staff data are available at the state, county, school district, and school levels. Local revenue election data are available at the state, county, and school district levels. Financial data are available at the state and school district levels. Comparison tools at the school district and school levels are also available. The K-12 public education data can be helpful to taxpayers and voters in local school parcel tax and local school general obligation bond election campaigns.

Local government data relating to matters other than budgetary or financial may also be helpful to voters in Proposition 218 tax elections. This includes local government performance data which can give taxpayers and voters a better sense if they are getting good value for the government services or programs to be financed from a Proposition 218 tax measure or their existing tax dollars. Examples include crime data in connection with public safety taxes, student performance data in connection with education taxes (or bonds), traffic data in connection with transportation taxes, public safety response times in connection with a public safety tax, and park usage and maintenance in connection with a parks and recreation tax. Most of the performance data about a local government can be obtained directly from the local government itself. In some instances, it may be necessary to make a written request for performance data under the California Public Records Act. It is generally preferable to obtain the performance data in electronic format to facilitate further study and analysis.

The California Secretary of State also provides a tool (known as Power Search) for searching campaign contribution data reported to the Secretary of State under the California Political Reform Act. Only electronically reported, state-level campaign data are generally provided. However, some contributions in local government elections, including tax elections under Proposition 218, are also included. Persons or entities that make campaign contributions at the local level, including in Proposition 218 tax elections, may also make campaign contributions at the state level that are politically relevant in a local tax election campaign. If such state level campaign contributions were made, the search tool will facilitate the identification of those campaign contributions.

The California Secretary of State also provides detailed lobbying activity data on the Cal-Access website. This includes detailed data by lobbyist employers such as local governments. Information that is available includes the amount spent on lobbying activities, the names of the lobbyists, and the specific legislation/agencies lobbied. Comparative lobbying data with other lobbyist employers, including other local governments, can also be obtained.

California law allows local governments to use public funds to lobby for or against legislation at the state and federal government levels. Such lobbying using public funds can also be done indirectly through associations such as the League of California Cities, the California State Association of Counties, and the Association of the California Water Agencies. Funding in support of these associations generally comes from annual dues payments (using public funds) made by the member local governments. It is common for local governments to spend significant amounts of public funds to lobby for or against proposed legislation that is contrary to the best interests of taxpayers, including supporting legislation that would erode taxpayer protections such as Propositions 13 and 218. Local governments seeking voter approval for a tax frequently claim a lack of public funding as a basis for proposing the tax. To the extent a local government spends significant public funds on lobbying activities in support of legislation that would erode or otherwise weaken taxpayer protections, this can become a significant campaign issue in a Proposition 218 local tax election.

Election Campaigns Involving Local Government Taxes 

Local tax measures frequently have well organized and funded support, especially from local public employee unions and often from the area business community. Business groups such as the Bay Area Council, the Silicon Valley Leadership Group, and the Los Angeles Area Chamber of Commerce frequently support local tax measures that disproportionately burden ordinary taxpayers, especially local sales taxes and local parcel taxes. Business interests that stand to financially benefit from the passage of a local tax measure also frequently make significant campaign contributions in support of such measures.

The ballot arguments contained in the official ballot pamphlet sent to voters are usually the only opportunity for the opponents of a local government tax levy to reach all voters. There is a specified word limit for arguments which is generally set by statute. Arguments must also be accurate and not misleading to avoid a successful legal challenge. Any procedures applicable to the filing of arguments must also be strictly followed. Ballot arguments must generally be filed early in the election process. As a result, it is important for interested voters to find out about the applicable deadlines for filing ballot arguments shortly following the decision by a local government to place a tax measure on the ballot. Ballot argument filing deadlines and requirements can generally be obtained from the local elections office conducting the tax election.

Initiative Power to Reduce or Repeal Local Government Levies 

One of the most significant provisions of Proposition 218 constitutionally reserves to local voters the exercise of the initiative power to reduce or repeal any local tax, assessment, fee or charge. The local initiative power under Proposition 218 is a powerful tool available to voters, particularly when local politicians are not responsive to their constituents in matters relating to local taxes, assessments, fees and charges. The specific constitutional language applicable to the local initiative power under Proposition 218 states:

The local initiative power under Proposition 218 is also subject to a significantly reduced signature requirement which cannot legally exceed the requirement applicable to statewide statutory initiatives. The specific maximum signature requirement under Proposition 218 is five percent (5%) of the votes for all candidates for Governor at the last gubernatorial election within the territory of the local government.

The local initiative power under Proposition 218 can be used to reduce or repeal local taxes like utility user taxes, sales taxes, business taxes, parcel taxes, and also to reduce or repeal local government fees and charges such as stormwater fees, groundwater fees, public ambulance/paramedic fees, public park/sports fees, public parking fees, or utility fees and charges for water (including drought fees and surcharges), sewer, or refuse collection services.

Exercise of the local initiative power under Proposition 218 was unanimously confirmed and upheld by the California Supreme Court in Bighorn-Desert View Water Agency v. Verjil, 39 Cal. 4th 205 (July 2006).  The California Legislative Analyst's Office stated that, based on the actual constitutional language of the initiative power provision, the only limits appear to be those under federal law. However, the scope of the local initiative power under Proposition 218 has yet to be fully defined by the California Supreme Court.

Article XIII D – Assessment and Property-Related Fee Reforms 

Section 4 of Proposition 218 added Article XIII D to the California Constitution. Article XIII D relates to special assessments on real property and property-related fees and charges.

Section 1 of Article XIII D specifies that its provisions apply to all special assessments and property-related fees and charges irrespective of whether such levies are imposed pursuant to state statute or local charter authority. This makes it clear that Article XIII D applies to charter cities in California.

Section 1 further specifies that nothing in Proposition 218 provides any new authority to any local government to impose any tax, special assessment, or property-related fee or charge. This means that the legal authority to impose a local tax, special assessment, or property-related fee or charge must come from an independent legal source such as a state statute or a local city charter provision.

Section 1 also specifies two types of laws that are not affected by Proposition 218. First, existing laws relating to the imposition of fees or charges as a condition of property development (e.g., developer fees).  Second, existing laws relating to the imposition of timber yield taxes.  Under the express language of Proposition 218, the foregoing exceptions are limited to laws existing at the time Proposition 218 became law.

Constitutional Definitions 

Section 2 of Article XIII D contains various definitions applicable to the article. A summary of the more significant definitions follows.

The term "agency" sets forth the public entities subject to the article. The term "agency" in Article XIII D incorporates the same broad definition of "local government" used in Article XIII C. As a result, if a public entity is a "local government" under Article XIII C it is also an "agency" under Article XIII D.

The term "assessment" is defined as "any levy or charge upon real property by an agency for a special benefit conferred upon the real property." If a levy or charge is an "assessment," it is subject to the procedures and requirements applicable to assessments in Article XIII D. 

Proposition 218 maintains the traditional requirement that a special assessment must specially benefit the assessed property. However, a key reform under Proposition 218 is that it significantly tightens what constitutes a "special benefit" for purposes of levying a lawful special assessment.

Under Proposition 218, a "special benefit" means "a particular and distinct benefit over and above general benefits conferred on real property locate in the district or to the public at large. General enhancement of property value does not constitute 'special benefit.'" The California Supreme Court unanimously confirmed and upheld the tighter "special benefit" definition in interpreting it to mean that a special benefit must affect an assessed property in a way that is particular and distinct from its effect on other parcels, and that real property in general and the public at large do not share.

Property-Related Fee or Charge 

Proposition 218 created a new type of fee or charge known as a property-related fee or charge. Whether a fee or charge is "property-related" is legally significant because if a fee or charge is "property-related," it is subject to the procedures and requirements applicable to such levies in Article XIII D. The detailed procedures and requirements for property-related fees or charges are contained in Section 6 of Article XIII D.

A "property-related" fee or charge is "any levy other than an ad valorem tax, a special tax, or an assessment, imposed by an agency upon a parcel or upon a person as an incident of property ownership, including a user fee or charge for a property-related service." A "property-related service" is defined as "a public service having a direct relationship to property ownership."

Initially, the California Supreme Court in 2001 narrowly interpreted what constitutes a "property-related" fee or charge in concluding that a residential rental inspection fee was not "property-related."

In 2002, a California appellate court held that an in-lieu franchise fee for water, sewer, and refuse collection services was a "property-related" fee subject to Article XIII D. Also in 2002, another California appellate court held that a stormwater drainage fee imposed on developed parcels was a "property-related" fee subject Article XIII D.

In 2004, the California Supreme Court held that a fire suppression fee imposed as a condition for making a new connection to a water system was not a "property-related" fee because the fee was not imposed by virtue of property ownership, but instead was imposed as an incident of the voluntary act of the property owner in applying for a water service connection.

In 2005, a California appellate court held that a fee in lieu of property taxes assessed upon municipal utility departments providing water, sewer, and solid waste collection services was a "property-related" fee.

In 2006, the California Supreme Court definitively held that a utility charge imposed by an agency for ongoing water delivery, including a consumption based utility charge, was a "property-related" fee. In reaching the preceding conclusion about consumption based utility charges, the court relied on the "user fee or charge for a property-related service" component of the constitutional definition. Based on the court's reasoning, fees and charges for ongoing sewer and refuse collection services are also "property-related."

In 2017, the California Supreme Court held that a fee imposed upon persons on the extraction of groundwater was generally no longer a property-related fee under Proposition 218.  The 2017 California Supreme Court decision disapproved two previous Court of Appeal published decisions holding that a fee on the extraction of groundwater was a property-related fee under Proposition 218.  This was the first time the California Supreme Court disapproved a published Court of Appeal decision with the resulting effect of taking away Proposition 218 constitutional rights and protections previously recognized by a California appellate court.

Although fees imposed upon persons on the extraction of groundwater are generally no longer a property-related fee under Proposition 218, such levies may still be subject to local voter approval as a tax under Proposition 26 which California voters approved in 2010.  However, groundwater fees imposed upon parcels of property may still be subject to the requirements of Proposition 218. Furthermore, some groundwater fees may be subject to Proposition 218 compliance as a result of independent statutory requirements. For example, fees on the extraction of groundwater imposed by a groundwater sustainability agency are statutorily required to be adopted in accordance with applicable constitutional provisions of Proposition 218.

Fees on the extraction of groundwater are also generally subject to reduction or repeal using the local initiative power under Proposition 218, including the significantly reduced signature requirement thereunder. This gives local voters an available legislative remedy to compel an election regarding a groundwater fee previously approved by a local government.  The local initiative power under Proposition 218 has been used before to repeal a local groundwater fee.

Proposition 218 Levy Limitations 

Section 3 of Article XIII D provides that no tax, assessment, or property-related fee or charge shall be assessed by any agency upon any parcel of property or upon any person as an incident of property ownership except: (1) constitutionally permitted property taxes based on the assessed value of the property; (2) special taxes receiving a two-thirds vote under Proposition 13; (3) assessments on real property as provided by Article XIII D; and (4) property-related fees or charges for property-related services as provided by Article XIII D.

The preceding requirement generally means that all parcel taxes must be levied as special taxes subject to two-thirds voter approval. The preceding requirement also means that property-related fees or charges may only be imposed for property-related services.

A tax imposed on the owners of wholesale liquid fuel storage facilities based solely on the storage capacity of the facilities' tanks, regardless of whether the tanks are used or any fuel is stored in them, was found by a California appellate court to be subject to the constitutional restrictions under Section 3 of Article XIII D.

The courts have yet to fully determine what taxes (e.g., certain utility user taxes) are deemed imposed upon a "person as an incident of property ownership," thereby requiring the tax to be a special tax subject to two-thirds voter approval.

Section 3 of Article XIII D also contains an exemption that for purposes of Article XIII D only, fees and charges for electrical or gas service are not property-related fees or charges imposed as an incident of property ownership. This means that electrical or gas service fees and charges imposed by local agencies are not subject to the procedures and requirements applicable to property-related fees or charges, including the proportional cost of service requirement.

The scope of the exemption for electrical or gas service fees and charges only applies to Article XIII D. Depending upon the specific circumstances, electrical or gas service fees and charges imposed by a local agency could constitute a "tax" subject to voter approval under Article XIII C, as amended by Proposition 26 in 2010.

Local Initiative Power to Reduce or Repeal Exempt Electrical or Gas Service Levies 

Electrical or gas service fees and charges that are exempt under Article XIII D and imposed by a local public agency (but not by a private entity) are generally subject to reduction or repeal using the local initiative power under Proposition 218, including the significantly reduced signature requirement thereunder. This provides local voters with a legislative remedy to address electrical or gas service utility fees and charges imposed by a local public agency that are considered excessive or unnecessary but not unlawful.

As an example, the local initiative power under Proposition 218 can be used to reduce electrical service fees and charges in situations where a local public agency such as a city transfers substantial utility fee or charge revenues to the general fund of the local public agency, whether done as legally allowable "profit" or as reimbursement for questionable services rendered to the utility by the local public agency. Once transferred to the general fund of the local public agency, the utility revenue proceeds can then generally be spent at the complete discretion of local politicians.

Assessments – Procedures and Requirements 

Section 4 of Article XIII D contains detailed procedures and requirements applicable to special benefit assessments on real property. The assessment procedures and requirements are designed to ensure that any special assessment on real property levied by an agency is a legitimate special assessment.

Proposition 218 also requires an agency to have a vote of the affected property owners (referred to as an assessment ballot proceeding) before any proposed new or increased assessment can be levied by an agency. Prior to Proposition 218, an agency was not required to obtain ballot approval from affected property owners before levying assessments on real property.

The assessment process is formally initiated by the local agency. For some assessments, other laws (e.g., a state statute or a local law such as an ordinance or a local charter provision) may also legally require a property owner petition to initiate the assessment process, but a property owner petition is not required under Proposition 218.

An agency that proposes to levy an assessment under Proposition 218 must first identify all parcels which will have a special benefit conferred upon them and upon which an assessment is proposed for imposition. The geographic area determined by an agency to contain all parcels of property which will have a special benefit conferred upon them is referred to as an assessment district.

The proportionate special benefit derived by each identified parcel must be determined by the agency in relationship to the entirety of the capital costs of the public improvement(s) being financed, the maintenance and operation expenses of the public improvement(s), or the cost of the property-related service(s) being provided. Proposition 218 does not preclude assessments for public services, but under the applicable constitutional requirements only "property-related services" are generally assessable.

Engineer's Report 

All assessments must be supported by a detailed engineer's report prepared by a registered professional engineer certified by the State of California. The required engineering report is ordinarily prepared by a registered civil engineer.

The engineer's report is a critical document in the assessment process because it contains the detailed supporting basis for levying the assessment. This includes a detailed supporting basis for compliance with the substantive requirements for assessments such as presence of special benefits, proper apportionment of special benefits between parcels, separability of general benefits from special benefits, proper assessment of parcels owned by public agencies, detailed cost information, and the manner of calculating assessments upon specific parcels. In a legal challenge concerning the validity of an assessment, the courts typically refer to the engineer's report to determine whether the assessment complies with Proposition 218.

Proposition 218 does not require the engineer's report be mailed to property owners as part of the assessment notification process. However, the engineer's report is a public record whereby a member of the public, including property owners subject to a proposed assessment, may make a written request and receive a copy of an engineer's report under the California Public Records Act.

The engineer's report is also sometimes available in electronic format where it can be downloaded by the public. However, Proposition 218 does not require an engineer's report be made available in an electronic format. The California Public Records Act generally requires that public records in an electronic format be made available when requested by a member of the public.

Electronic data files containing information relating to the calculation and/or amount of a proposed assessment for each parcel within an assessment district may also be available. Some assessment districts may contain many thousands of parcels, and sometimes the assessment calculations for each parcel are only available as an electronic data file. These data files are generally public records subject to disclosure under the California Public Records Act. The data files must also generally be made available in the electronic format requested by the public if the requested format is one that has been used by the agency to create copies for its own use or for provision to other public agencies. The foregoing requirement is important to facilitate independent analysis of electronic data files by the public for purposes of verifying Proposition 218 compliance.

Related electronic data files may also be used to help verify Proposition 218 compliance. In particular, use of geographic information system (GIS) data files. GIS data files containing location-based information relating to a proposed assessment for each parcel within an assessment district may also be available. In addition, separate GIS data files may have also been used as part of the assessment calculation process such as GIS data files containing the location and attributes of streetlights and parcels within an assessment district.

GIS data files may also be used in connection with the calculation of property-related fees and charges under Proposition 218 such as utility or stormwater fees. The California Supreme Court has ruled that GIS database files are generally deemed public records subject to disclosure under the California Public Records Act.

Special Benefit and Proportionality Requirements 

Under Proposition 218, only special benefits are assessable. Proposition 218 contains its own constitutional definition of "special benefit" that significantly tightens the kind of special assessments an agency can levy on real property. Some special assessments that may have been permissible prior to Proposition 218 are no longer legally permissible because of a lack of "special benefit" under the tightened constitutional definition.

Proposition 218 also requires an agency to separate the general benefits from the special benefits conferred on a parcel. Pre-Proposition 218 case law did not invalidate assessments because they also provided general benefits in addition to special benefits, and the courts did not demand a strict separation of general benefits from special benefits. The benefit separation requirement under Proposition 218 helps ensure compliance with the requirement that only special benefits are assessable. Since general benefits are not assessable, they must be excluded and financed using revenue sources other than assessments (e.g., from taxes).

The "assessment" definition refers to a levy on real property for a "special benefit" conferred upon the real property. Since permissible assessments are limited to special benefits conferred upon real property, in addition to separating the general benefits conferred on a parcel, benefits to persons or to personal property must also be excluded from assessment. This makes it more difficult to legally justify the imposition of special assessments for public improvements or services that primarily benefit people instead of real property.

Under Proposition 218, no assessment may be imposed on any parcel which exceeds the reasonable cost of the proportional special benefit conferred on that parcel. The proportionality requirement ensures that the aggregate assessment imposed on all parcels is distributed among all assessed parcels in proportion to the special benefits conferred on each parcel. An agency may provide a discounted assessment less than the reasonable cost of the proportional special benefit conferred so long as any discounts do not cause the assessments imposed on the remaining parcels in the assessment district to exceed the reasonable cost of the proportional special benefit conferred on those parcels.

Public Parcels Also Subject to Assessment 

Proposition 218 provides that parcels within an assessment district that are owned or used by any local agency, the State of California, or the United States (the federal government) are not exempt from assessment unless the agency proposing the assessment can demonstrate by clear and convincing evidence that the publicly owned parcels receive no special benefit. This requirement has been confirmed and upheld by a California appellate court.

Historically, publicly owned parcels were generally exempt from paying special assessments on real property. The courts construed an implied exemption for special assessments under the provision of the California Constitution exempting local governments from property taxation. The practical effect of the historical exemption was to require private property owners, in addition to paying an assessment share attributable to their own parcel, to also pay the share of assessments that would otherwise be attributable to publicly owned parcels.

While elimination of the assessment exemption applies to all levels of government, there may be instances where federally owned property, due to restrictions under federal law which Proposition 218 cannot legally override, will continue to be exempt from assessments. To the extent any exemption for federal property may apply under federal law, Proposition 218 nonetheless prohibits an agency from shifting the assessment burden from federally exempt parcels to other parcels within an assessment district.

Written Notice Requirement and Assessment Ballot 

Once an agency has identified the parcels subject to an assessment, the agency must then calculate the amount of the proposed assessment for each identified parcel and must then give the record owner of each identified parcel written notice by mail of the proposed assessment. The required written notice must state the total assessment amount chargeable to the entire assessment district, the amount chargeable to the record owner's particular parcel, the duration of the assessment, the reason(s) for the assessment and the basis upon which the amount of the proposed assessment was calculated, together with the date, time, and location of a public hearing on the proposed assessment.

The required notice must also include, in a conspicuous place on the notice, a summary of the procedures applicable to the completion, return, and tabulation of the assessment ballots required under Proposition 218, including a disclosure statement that the assessment will not be imposed if the ballots submitted in opposition to the assessment exceed the ballots submitted in favor of the assessment, with the ballots weighted according to the proportional financial obligation of each assessed property.

Some property owners may not realize the importance of the assessment mailing and end up throwing it away thinking it is junk mail. To help address this matter, the California Legislature enacted additional requirements relating to the envelope containing the assessment notice and ballot. On the face of each envelope mailed to the record owner in which the required notice and assessment ballot are enclosed, there must appear in substantially the following form the phrase "OFFICIAL BALLOT ENCLOSED" in no smaller than 16-point bold type. A local agency may also place the phrase "OFFICIAL BALLOT ENCLOSED" on the face of the envelope in a language or languages other than English.

Every notice mailed to owners of identified parcels within an assessment district must also contain an assessment ballot which includes the agency's address for receipt of the assessment ballot once completed by any record owner receiving the notice whereby the record owner may indicate his or her name, reasonable identification of the parcel owned, and his or her support or opposition to the proposed assessment.

The California Legislature has enacted additional requirements relating to the completion and delivery of assessment ballots. While not required by Proposition 218, these additional statutory requirements must be followed for an assessment ballot to be counted. An assessment ballot must be signed and either mailed or otherwise delivered to the address indicated on the assessment ballot. Regardless of the method of delivery, all assessment ballots must be received at the address indicated, or the location of the public testimony, in order to be included in the majority protest tabulation. An assessment ballot may be submitted, changed, or withdrawn by the person who submitted the ballot prior to the conclusion of the public testimony on the proposed assessment at the required public hearing.

Public Hearing Requirement and Assessment Ballot Tabulation 

The agency must conduct at least one public hearing upon the proposed assessment not less than 45 days after mailing the notice of the proposed assessment to the record owners of each identified parcel subject to the proposed assessment. At the public hearing, any person is permitted to present written or oral testimony to the agency. The public hearing may also be continued from time to time.

At the public hearing, the agency must consider all protests against the proposed assessment. At the conclusion of the public hearing, an impartial person designated by the agency who does not have a vested interest in the outcome of the proposed assessment must tabulate the assessment ballots. The governing body of the agency may, if necessary, continue the assessment ballot tabulation at a different time or location accessible to the public, provided the governing body announces the time and location at the public hearing. The impartial person may use technological methods of tabulating the assessment ballots, including, but not limited to, punchcard or optically readable (bar-coded) assessment ballots.

In tabulating the assessment ballots, the ballots must be weighted according to the proportional financial obligation of each affected parcel. If more than one of the record owners of an identified parcel submits an assessment ballot, the amount of the proposed assessment to be imposed upon the identified parcel must be allocated to each ballot submitted in proportion to the respective record ownership interests or, if the ownership interests are not shown on the record, as established to the satisfaction of the agency by documentation provided by those record owners. The assessment ballot process under Proposition 218 is frequently referred to as an "assessment ballot proceeding" and is not technically regarded as an election.

The weighted assessment ballot requirement under Proposition 218 is not new. Neither is the requirement that the assessment ballot process be limited to property owners. Prior to Proposition 218, the majority protest process was limited to property owners subject to a proposed assessment. For a small number of assessments, a property owner election with weighted voting was legally required. The constitutionality of these property owner elections has previously been upheld by the California Supreme Court.

Proposition 218 does not directly address issues associated with the secrecy of assessment ballots. However, these issues have been addressed by statutes adopted by the California Legislature.

An assessment ballot must be in a form that conceals its contents once it is sealed by the person submitting the assessment ballot, and must remain sealed until the tabulation of assessment ballots starts. Assessment ballots must be unsealed and tabulated in public view at the conclusion of the required public hearing so as to permit all interested persons to meaningfully monitor the accuracy of the ballot tabulation process. During and after the ballot tabulation, assessment ballots and the information used to determine the weight of each assessment ballot are disclosable public records under the California Public Records Act, and must be made equally available for inspection by the proponents and the opponents of the proposed assessment. Assessment ballots must be preserved for a minimum of two years, after which they may be destroyed as provided by law.

The California Supreme Court has ruled that voting secrecy protections under the California Constitution do not apply to assessment ballot proceedings under Proposition 218. To the extent any secrecy protections exist for assessment ballots, they are generally derived from state statutes or local laws. Prior to Proposition 218, assessment protests by property owners were generally treated as public records subject to disclosure under the California Public Records Act. Proposition 218 did not alter the public record status of assessment protests by property owners.

Majority Protest 

An agency may not impose a proposed assessment if there is a majority protest. A majority protest exists if, upon the conclusion of the required public hearing, assessment ballots submitted in opposition to the proposed assessment exceed the assessment ballots submitted in favor of the proposed assessment. The assessment ballots are weighted by the amount of the proposed assessment to be imposed upon the identified parcel for which each assessment ballot was submitted.

Proposition 218 continues the concept of a majority protest for assessments. However, prior to Proposition 218, a majority protest typically required an absolute majority of property owners (often using a weighted formula) to protest against a proposed assessment. No assessment ballot was involved. If a property owner did not affirmatively protest an assessment (i.e., if a property owner did nothing), that effectively counted as a vote in support of the proposed assessment.  This contributed to the inequity of the special assessment process prior to Proposition 218.

Also prior to Proposition 218, even if an absolute majority of property owners protested an assessment and a majority protest existed, state laws often allowed local agencies to overrule a majority protest by a specified supermajority vote requirement (typically by a four-fifths vote) of the governing body of the local agency. What this meant in practical terms for a typical five-member local governing body was that it would take at least three votes to approve an assessment in the absence of a majority protest and at least four votes would be required to overrule a majority protest. Prior to Proposition 218, sustained majority protests for assessments were rare events.

One of the most significant assessment reforms under Proposition 218 is how a majority protest is determined. Rather than being based on an absolute majority, as was the case prior to Proposition 218, a majority protest is now determined based on the assessment ballots actually received by the local agency. If a property owner does not properly return an assessment ballot, that fact will not count for or against the proposed assessment. Proposition 218 also does not allow an agency to overrule a majority protest. If a majority protest exists under Proposition 218, the agency is constitutionally prohibited from imposing the proposed assessment.

Validity of Assessment Ballot Process 

The validity of the assessment ballot process under Proposition 218 was upheld by a California appellate court in 2002. Property owner elections with weighted voting do not violate the federal constitutional requirement of "one man, one vote" under the limited circumstances of a special-purpose unit of government assigned the performance of functions affecting definable groups of constituents more than others. Such is the case with assessment districts under Proposition 218. Furthermore, since only special benefits are assessable under Proposition 218, voters residing within the boundaries of an assessment district who do not own property within the assessment district are also not deemed under the California Constitution to have been deprived of the right to vote for any assessment.

Proposition 218 contains a special additional requirement in the event a court determines the assessment ballot process violates federal law. If any such violation were to occur, an assessment may not be levied under Proposition 218 unless approved by a two-thirds vote of the electorate in the assessment district. The practical effect of the federal law invalidity provision is that if the assessment ballot process were invalidated under federal law, the approval requirements for assessments under Proposition 218 would become even more restrictive than if either no legal challenge under federal law had occurred or if any such legal challenge were unsuccessful. However, the assessment ballot process under Proposition 218 has been found by a California appellate court to not violate applicable federal law.

Local Agency Burden to Demonstrate Compliance 

Prior to Proposition 218, a person challenging an assessment had the burden to prove that the assessment was not legal. An important reform under Proposition 218 is that it shifted the burden of demonstrating compliance to the local agency in a lawsuit challenging an assessment. In any legal action contesting the validity of an assessment, the burden is on the local agency to demonstrate that the properties in question receive a special benefit over and above the benefits conferred on the public at large and that the amount of any contested assessment is proportional to, and no greater than, the benefits conferred on the properties in question. This change makes it significantly easier for taxpayers to win a legal challenge.

The Landmark 2008 Silicon Valley Taxpayers Supreme Court Case 

The detailed and substantive assessment reforms contained in Proposition 218 were unanimously confirmed and upheld by the California Supreme Court in Silicon Valley Taxpayers' Association, Inc. v. Santa Clara County Open Space Authority, 44 Cal. 4th 431 (July 2008).

The Silicon Valley Taxpayers case is also one of the most important and significant taxpayer protection cases in a generation (and is listed as one of the most important and influential decisions in the history of the California Supreme Court) in large part because of the California Supreme Court holding on the standard of review issue. The standard of review issue addresses the level of deference a court will ordinarily give a local agency in reviewing its legislative actions such as the approval of an assessment. The extent of deference given by the courts has a major bearing on the outcome of a lawsuit.

Before Proposition 218 became law, in a legal challenge involving an assessment the courts reviewed the actions of the local agency under a highly deferential standard of review. Under this highly deferential standard of review, the courts presumed that an assessment was valid and the person challenging the assessment had to show that the record before the local agency clearly did not support the underlying determinations of special benefit and proportionality. The underlying legal basis for the historical deferential standard of review was that the establishment of an assessment district takes place as a result of a peculiarly legislative process. As a result, the constitutional separation of powers doctrine demanded a more deferential standard of review by the courts. Property owners rarely won assessment lawsuits on the merits prior to Proposition 218. Because it was so difficult to win a legal challenge, lawyers were candidly advised not to bother even trying to challenge an assessment in court.

The constitutional status of the substantive assessment requirements under Proposition 218 altered the standard of review analysis. The substantive requirements for assessments are contained in constitutional provisions of dignity at least equal to the constitutional separation of powers provision. Prior to Proposition 218, special assessment laws were generally statutory, and the constitutional separation of powers doctrine served as a foundation for a more deferential standard of review by the courts. However, after Proposition 218 became law, an assessment's validity is now a constitutional question.

Relying on various provisions of Proposition 218, including the burden of demonstration provision applicable to assessments, as well as language in the Proposition 218 ballot pamphlet, the California Supreme Court concluded that because Proposition 218's underlying purpose was to limit government's power to exact revenue and to curtail the deference that had been traditionally accorded legislative enactments on fees, assessments, and charges, a more rigorous standard of review was warranted. The separation of powers doctrine no longer justified allowing a local agency to usurp the judicial function of interpreting and applying the constitutional provisions that govern assessments under Proposition 218.

Under the new standard adopted by the California Supreme Court in the Silicon Valley Taxpayers case, California courts must exercise their independent judgment in reviewing whether an assessment imposed by a local agency violates the applicable constitutional provisions of Proposition 218. This new standard makes it significantly easier for taxpayers to win lawsuits challenging the validity of assessments under Proposition 218.

The California Supreme Court in the Silicon Valley Taxpayers case also stated that with respect to Proposition 218 all legislation must be subordinate to the constitutional provision, and in furtherance of its purpose, and must not in any particular attempt to narrow or embarrass the measure. As a result, when government, whether state or local, acts in a legislative capacity it has no authority to exercise its discretion in a way that violates Proposition 218 or undermines its effect. Thus, even the California Legislature cannot enact statutes that narrow or undermine the constitutional protections under Proposition 218.

The Silicon Valley Taxpayers case profoundly changed the legal environment in California as it relates to constitutional taxpayer protections. As a California Law Review article noted following the Silicon Valley Taxpayers decision: "[T]he California Supreme Court's opinion in Silicon Valley elevates fiscal limitations to the same level as core California constitutional issues." This represented a watershed change in judicial interpretation compared to the historical interpretation of constitutional taxpayer protections in California, especially under Proposition 13, that generally resulted in a narrow construction of constitutional taxpayer protections to limit their scope, application, and impact.

Appellate counsel who represented the interests of taxpayers and Proposition 218 before the California Supreme Court in the landmark Silicon Valley Taxpayers case included Tony Tanke, Jack Cohen, and James Burling. The successful equal dignity argument applicable to the standard of review issue in the Silicon Valley Taxpayers case was developed by constitutional attorney Jack Cohen.

Local Initiative Power to Reduce or Repeal Approved Assessments 

After approval of an assessment, the local initiative power under Proposition 218 can generally be used to reduce or repeal that assessment. This includes the significantly reduced signature requirement thereunder.

An example where such an initiative may be appropriate involves inequities that occasionally occur from the weighted ballot requirement for assessments, particularly in assessment districts containing a large number of publicly owned parcels. An assessment district consisting of residential parcels paying lower assessments and a significant number of larger parcels paying higher assessments, such as large publicly owned or commercial parcels, can sometimes result in an assessment being approved under weighted voting even though a majority of the residential property owners opposed the assessment. A local initiative to reduce or repeal the assessment is an available remedy to address such an inequity. Should an assessment reduction or repeal initiative qualify for the ballot, the election would be by the registered voters and the ballots would not be weighted.

Article Effective Date; Assessment Exemptions 

Section 5 of Article XIII D sets forth the effective date of the article. Section 5 also includes four exemptions from the assessment procedures and approval process contained in Section 4 of Article XIII D.

Section 5 states that Article XIII D becomes effective the day after the election (November 6, 1996 effective date) unless otherwise provided. Section 5 further states that beginning July 1, 1997, all existing, new, or increased assessments must comply with Article XIII D. However, Section 5 specifies that four classes of assessments existing on the effective date of Article XIII D (November 6, 1996) are exempt from the procedures and approval process contained in that article.

Existing Assessment Exemptions 

The first exemption is for any assessment imposed exclusively to finance the capital costs or maintenance and operation expenses for sidewalks, streets, sewers, water, flood control, drainage systems, or vector control. This specific exemption is often referred to as the "traditional purpose" exemption, and was intended to allow the continued imposition of traditionally appropriate, nonabusive assessments. Technically, if an existing assessment is not imposed exclusively for an enumerated traditional purpose, it does not qualify for the exemption.

However, any subsequent increases in a traditional purpose assessment must comply with the procedures and approval process contained in Section 4 of Article XIII D. The traditional purpose exemption applicable to special assessments is broader in scope than the narrower election exemptions applicable to property-related fees and charges which only apply to fees and charges for water, sewer, or refuse collection services.

The second exemption is for any assessment imposed pursuant to a petition signed by the person(s) owning all of the parcels subject to the assessment at the time the assessment was initially imposed. This exemption typically involves circumstances where a developer approved one or more assessments as a condition for developing property. Any subsequent increases in a petition exempt assessment must comply with the procedures and approval process contained in Section 4 of Article XIII D.

The third exemption is for any assessment the proceeds of which are used to repay bonded indebtedness of which the failure to pay would violate the United States Constitution. The exemption only applies to the extent that the Contract Impairment Clause of the United States Constitution is violated.

The fourth exemption is for any assessment which previously received majority voter approval from the voters voting in an election on the issue of the assessment. Prior to Proposition 218, voter approval of an assessment was generally not required, but a local agency could voluntarily decide to hold an election on the approval of an assessment. Technically, to qualify for the exemption the election had to be legally binding and not advisory in nature. Any subsequent increases in a prior voter approval exempt assessment must comply with the procedures and approval process contained in Section 4 of Article XIII D.

When an agency "increases" an assessment, compliance with the assessment process under Proposition 218 is required and the exemptions generally do not apply to the increased assessment component. The California Legislature adopted a statute interpreting the term "increase" as applied to assessments. However, the courts have the final say in interpreting when an assessment is "increased" under Proposition 218.

Under the applicable statutory provisions, an assessment is deemed "increased" for purposes of Proposition 218 when a local agency makes a decision that does any of the following: (1) increases any applicable rate used to calculate the assessment; or (2) revises the methodology by which the assessment is calculated, if that revision results in an increased amount being levied on any parcel.

Local Initiative Power to Reduce or Repeal Existing Exempt Assessments 

Although assessments exempt under Section 5 are not subject to the assessment approval process contained in Article XIII D, the local initiative power under Proposition 218, including the significantly reduced signature requirement thereunder, can generally be used to reduce or repeal an exempt assessment since that power expressly applies to assessments. The only exception would likely be for the bonded indebtedness exemption where an actual violation of the Contract Impairment Clause of the United States Constitution would occur if the local initiative power under Proposition 218 were exercised to reduce or repeal an assessment subject to that particular exemption.

Property-Related Fees and Charges – Procedures and Requirements 

Section 6 of Article XIII D contains the detailed procedures and requirements applicable to property-related fees and charges. These provisions are designed to ensure that any property-related fee or charge levied by a local agency is a legitimate fee or charge and not an unlawful tax imposed without voter approval.

The property-related fee and charge provisions only apply if a fee or charge is "property-related" under the constitutional definition contained in Proposition 218. Some property-related fees or charges are levied upon parcels and appear on the annual property tax bill sent to property owners while other property-related fees or charges are levied upon persons and may be paid by a tenant instead of the property owner.

If a fee or charge is not "property-related" under Proposition 218, it may nonetheless be subject to voter approval as a "tax" under Proposition 26 (2010). Proposition 26 amended Proposition 218 by adding a broad constitutional definition of a "tax" for purposes of determining the scope of levies subject to the voter approval requirement for local taxes under Proposition 218.

Property-related fees or charges may only be levied for "property-related services." A "property-related service" is a public service having a direct relationship to property ownership. Some of the more common property-related fees or charges levied by local agencies include utility fees for ongoing domestic water, sanitary sewer, refuse collection services, stormwater fees, and flood control fees. Groundwater augmentation fees imposed upon persons are generally no longer deemed property-related fees or charges under Proposition 218, but rather are subject to the less stringent constitutional protections under Proposition 26 (2010).

For purposes of the property-related fee and charge provisions of Proposition 218, "property ownership" includes tenancies of real property where tenants are directly liable to pay the property-related fee or charge in question. This means that if a tenant is directly liable to pay a property-related fee or charge, that tenant is also regarded as a "property owner" for purposes of the procedures and requirements applicable to property-related fees and charges, including entitlement to notice and the right to protest.

Triggering Events for Property-Related Fee or Charge Provisions 

The type of property-related service involved as well as whether the property-related fee or charge is new, increased, or already existing determines to what extent a levy is subject to the various procedures and requirements contained in Section 6 of Article XIII D, including whether an election is required. Starting July 1, 1997, all property-related fees or charges must comply with Section 6 of Article XIII D.

When an agency "increases" a property-related fee or charge, compliance with the property-related fee or charge process under Proposition 218 is required. The California Legislature adopted a statute interpreting the term "increase" as applied to property-related fees or charges. However, the courts have the final say in interpreting when a property-related fee or charge is "increased" under Proposition 218.

A property-related fee or charge is "increased" for purposes of Proposition 218 when an agency makes a decision that does any of the following: (1) increases any applicable rate used to calculate the property-related fee or charge; or (2) revises the methodology by which the property-related fee or charge is calculated, if that revision results in an increased amount being levied on any person or parcel of property.

A property-related fee or charge is not "increased" for purposes of Proposition 218 when an agency does either or both of the following: (1) adjusts the amount of a property-related fee or charge in accordance with a schedule of adjustments, including a clearly defined formula for inflation adjustment that was adopted by the agency prior to November 6, 1996; or (2) implements or collects a previously approved property-related fee or charge so long as the fee or charge rate is not increased beyond the level previously approved by the agency, and the methodology previously approved by the agency is not revised so as to result in an increase in the amount being levied on any person or parcel of property.

A property-related fee or charge is also not "increased" for purposes of Proposition 218 in the case in which the actual payments from a person or a parcel of property are higher than would have resulted when the agency approved the property-related fee or charge, if those higher payments are attributable to events other than an increased fee or charge rate or revised methodology, such as a change in the density, intensity, or nature of the use of land.

When an agency "extends" a property-related fee or charge, compliance with the property-related fee or charge process under Proposition 218 is required. The California Legislature adopted a statute interpreting the term "extended" for purposes of the property-related fee or charge provisions of Proposition 218. However, the courts have the final say in interpreting when a property-related fee or charge is "extended" under Proposition 218.

Under the statute, a property-related fee or charge is "extended" for purposes of Proposition 218 when, as applied to an existing property-related fee or charge, an agency extends the stated effective period for the property-related fee or charge, including, but not limited to, amendment or removal of a sunset provision or expiration date. While expanding the geographic area subject to a property-related fee or charge does not constitute an "extension" under the statutory definition, it may nonetheless constitute a property-related fee or charge "increase" and thereby subject the levy to the property-related fee or charge process under Proposition 218 on that basis.

Procedures for New or Increased Property-Related Fees or Charges 

Subdivision (a) of Section 6 of Article XIII D sets forth the procedures an agency must follow for any new or increased property-related fee or charge. The procedures for a new or increased property-related fee or charge help ensure that a property owner receives appropriate written notice and is given an opportunity to provide input prior to the local agency deciding whether to approve a proposed property-related fee or charge.

Written Notice and Public Hearing Requirements 

The parcels upon which a new or increased property-related fee or charge is proposed for imposition must be identified by the agency. The amount or rate of the property-related fee or charge proposed for imposition upon each identified parcel must also be calculated by the agency. The agency must then provide written notice by mail of the proposed property-related fee or charge to the record owner of each identified parcel upon which the property-related fee or charge is proposed for imposition. The written notice must include the amount or rate of the property-related fee or charge proposed upon each parcel, the basis upon which the amount or rate of the proposed property-related fee or charge was calculated, the reason(s) for the property-related fee or charge, together with the date, time and location of at least one public hearing on the proposed property-related fee or charge.

The required notice may be given by including it in the agency's regular billing statement for the property-related fee or charge, or by any other mailing by the agency to the address to which the agency customarily mails the billing statement for the property-related fee or charge. However, if the agency desires to preserve any authority it may have to record or enforce a lien on the parcel to which a property-related service is provided, the agency must also mail notice to the record owner's address shown on the last equalized assessment roll if that address is different from the billing or service address.

The agency must conduct at least one public hearing upon the proposed property-related fee or charge not less than 45 days after mailing the notice of the proposed property-related fee or charge to the record owner(s) of each identified parcel upon which the property-related fee or charge is proposed for imposition.

Majority Protest for Property-Related Fees and Charges 

Proposition 218 allows record owners of each identified parcel upon which the property-related fee or charge is proposed to formally protest the proposed levy. At the required public hearing, the agency must consider all protests against the proposed property-related fee or charge. Only one written protest per parcel, filed by an owner or tenant of the parcel, may be counted in calculating a majority protest to a proposed new or increased property-related fee or charge. If valid written protests against the proposed property-related fee or charge are presented by a majority of owners of the identified parcels, the agency is prohibited from imposing the property-related fee or charge. Failure to comply with any legal requirement, including any applicable statutory requirements, can result in the invalidation of a protest document for purposes of determining whether a majority protest exists.

The majority protest provision for property-related fees and charges requires an absolute majority of the owners of the identified parcels to protest against a proposed property-related fee or charge to legally prohibit imposition of the levy. If a majority protest for a proposed property-related fee or charge is attained, the agency cannot legally override the majority protest.

As a result of the absolute majority requirement, majority protests for proposed property-related fees and charges occasionally occur but not that often. They are most likely to occur in situations where the proposed levy is controversial and the number of affected parcels is small. Where the number of affected parcels is large, a majority protest is very difficult to attain even for controversial levies.

Proposition 218 does not require that a protest document for a proposed property-related fee or charge be included with the required written notice. However, some agencies may include a protest document with the required notice as a courtesy. Written protests are often submitted by property owners in letter form. Protest documents are generally treated as public records subject to public disclosure under the California Public Records Act. Effective January 1, 2017, written protests must be preserved by the agency for a minimum of two years following the date of the public hearing to consider written protests.

Local Initiative Power to Reduce or Repeal Agency Approved Property-Related Levies 

Sometimes a proposed property-related fee or charge may be controversial and/or have significant opposition but not enough opposition to attain a majority protest. The lack of a majority protest does not legally obligate an agency to levy the property-related fee or charge. Occasionally, the governing body of an agency may be responsive to the objections and protests by the public concerning a proposed property-related fee or charge. Responses may take the form of not levying the property-related fee or charge or modifying the property-related fee or charge to make it more acceptable to the public.

However, in situations where the governing body of an agency is not responsive to the objections and protests by the public and approves a controversial property-related fee or charge, the local initiative power under Proposition 218 can generally be used to reduce or repeal the property-related fee or charge. This includes the significantly reduced signature requirement thereunder. An example application is a local initiative to reduce or repeal a significant water fee or charge increase resulting from customers conserving water under drought conditions.

Political Accountability For Approving Controversial Property-Related Levies 

The approval of any property-related fee or charge under Proposition 218 is a political decision generally made by local elected officials. As a result, any approval, especially if there is significant public controversy concerning the approval, is a political matter for which those local elected officials approving the property-related fee or charge can be held politically accountable during the next election for members of the governing body of the local agency.

In extraordinary circumstances, especially when there is great hostility by local politicians in any matter relating to the approval of a property-related fee or charge (or any other levy subject to the requirements of Proposition 218), exercise of the local recall power is also generally an available option to local voters. The California Secretary of State has released a publication on the procedures for recalling elected officials in California.

Requirements for Existing, New, or Increased Property-Related Fees and Charges 

Proposition 218 includes five requirements that every property-related fee or charge must satisfy. An agency may not extend, impose or increase any property-related fee or charge unless it meets all five requirements. The five requirements help ensure that any property-related fee or charge is a legitimate fee or charge and not a tax masquerading as a fee or charge. All property-related fees and charges are subject to and must comply with the five requirements. Property-related fees or charges existing when Proposition 218 became effective must have been in compliance by July 1, 1997.

If a property-related fee or charge is prohibited under any of the five requirements, Proposition 218 does not prohibit that levy from being structured and imposed as a tax so long as all other applicable legal requirements are satisfied, including the voter approval requirement.

For purposes of determining whether a property-related fee or charge complies with the five requirements, a member of the public may generally make a written request and receive a copy of any local agency supporting documentation pursuant to the California Public Records Act. The payment of a fee covering the direct costs of duplicating requested pages from any supporting documentation may also be required by the agency.

Total Cost Requirement 

The first requirement is that the revenues derived from the property-related fee or charge must not exceed the funds required to provide the property related service. This is an aggregate cost requirement applicable to the combined cost from all parcels while the cost of service requirement contains a similar requirement at the parcel specific level. Use of the term "required" in the constitutional language is intended to preclude local agencies from levying property-related fees or charges for costs that are excessive, unreasonable or unnecessary. If voters believe a property-related fee or charge is excessive, unreasonable or unnecessary, exercise of the local initiative power under Proposition 218 to reduce or repeal the levy is also an available option.

Proposition 218 has been construed by the courts to prevent local governments from transferring revenues from a water utility to a general fund, unless the transferred funds are reimbursing the general fund for legitimate expenses related to the water utility.  For example, if a city's general fund is used to pay for some water utility overhead costs, a transfer of revenue to the general fund is legally permitted.  If utility revenues exceed the cost of providing the service, the excess fees are considered a tax, and are not prohibited outright, but must instead be approved by the voters as a separate tax.

Use Requirement 

The second requirement is that revenues derived from the property-related fee or charge must not be used for any purpose other than that for which the property-related fee or charge was imposed.

Proportional Cost of Service Requirement 

The third requirement is that the amount of a property-related fee or charge must not exceed the proportional cost of the property-related service attributable to the parcel. This requirement is frequently referred to as the "cost of service" requirement.

Proposition 218 does not expressly require an agency to prepare a detailed report in support of a property-related fee or charge. However, in order to comply with the requirements applicable to property-related fees and charges, a local agency must generally prepare a detailed supporting report. This is especially the case since under Proposition 218 in any legal action contesting the validity of a property-related fee or charge, the burden is on the local agency to demonstrate compliance with the law.

A property-related fee or charge report prepared by a local agency is generally a public record whereby a member of the public may make a written request and receive a copy of the report under the California Public Records Act. Payment of a fee covering the direct costs of duplicating any requested pages from a property-related fee or charge report may also be required.

Actual Use or Immediate Availability Requirement 

The fourth requirement is that no property-related fee or charge may be imposed for a property-related service unless that service is actually used by, or immediately available to, the owner of the property in question. In addition, property-related fees or charges based on potential or future use of a property-related service are not permitted.

The fourth requirement is intended to add a temporal component to the property-related fee or charge restrictions. Property owners using an existing property-related service are not supposed to pay for costs associated with future use of that service, including future service to their own property. This is especially the case with respect to paying for the costs of expensive public improvements for which property owners may not receive direct benefits from until years later (if ever at all). However, California appellate courts have generally allowed local agencies greater latitude in charging property owners for potential or future use of a property-related service.

The fourth requirement also provides that a standby charge, regardless of whether characterized as a property-related charge or an assessment, is classified as an assessment and may not be levied by a local agency without compliance with the more restrictive procedures and requirements applicable to assessments under Proposition 218.
The reason for that provision is that a standby charge has historically been considered an assessment levied upon real property according to the availability of water.

General Governmental Services Prohibition 

The fifth requirement is that no property-related fee or charge may be levied for general governmental services including, but not limited to, police, fire, ambulance or library services, where the general governmental service is available to the public at large in substantially the same manner as it is to property owners. The fifth requirement makes it more difficult for local agencies to lawfully impose property-related fees or charges for general governmental services.

Tiered (Conservation) Water Rates and the 2015 Capistrano Decision 

In 2015, a California appellate court in Capistrano Taxpayers Association, Inc. v. City of San Juan Capistrano, 235 Cal. App. 4th 1493 (April 2015) unanimously construed Proposition 218 as prohibiting local governments from charging higher water rates on heavier water users (tiered or conservation water rates) without complying with the cost of service requirement under the measure.  The Capistrano decision received widespread international coverage in the media because the decision came down during a severe drought in California. The Capistrano decision was also criticized by then California Governor Jerry Brown when the decision came down.

Tiered water rates generally do not place a cap on the amount of water a parcel may use. Rather, tiered rates make the cost of using water more expensive as a price signal to encourage water conservation. This means that a parcel may generally use as much water as desired as long as the water customer pays the higher price. Thus, tiered rates also function as a revenue raising device (a tax) to the extent the rates exceed the cost of providing the service to the parcel. Property-related charges that exceed the cost of service were precisely the type of abuse by local governments that Proposition 218 was intended to no longer permit.

However, the Capistrano decision did not hold that Proposition 218 invalidated all tiered water rates in California. The appellate court merely stated that "tiers must still correspond to the actual cost of providing service at a given level of usage. The water agency here did not try to calculate the cost of actually providing water at its various tier levels. It merely allocated all its costs among the price tier levels, based not on costs, but on predetermined usage budgets."

The Capistrano decision further stated that "[t]he way Proposition 218 operates, water rates that exceed the cost of service operate as a tax, similar to the way a 'carbon tax' might be imposed on use of energy. But, we should emphasize: Just because such above-cost rates are a tax does not mean they cannot be imposed—they just have to be submitted to the relevant electorate and approved by the people in a vote . . . However, if a local government body chooses to impose tiered rates unilaterally without a vote, those tiers must be based on cost of service for the incremental level of usage, not predetermined budgets."

The Capistrano decision also rejected the argument that higher water tier prices that exceed the cost of service may be justified as "penalties" not within the purview of Proposition 218 restrictions. In holding that this argument is inconsistent with Proposition 218, the court stated that "[i]t would open up a loophole in article XIII D, section 6, subdivision (b)(3) [part of Proposition 218] so large it would virtually repeal it. All an agency supplying any service would need to do to circumvent article XIII D, section 6, subdivision (b)(3), would be to establish a low legal base use for that service, pass an ordinance to the effect that any usage above the base amount is illegal, and then decree that the penalty for such illegal usage equals the incrementally increased rate for that service. Such a methodology could easily yield rates that have no relation at all to the actual cost of providing the service at the penalty levels. And it would make a mockery of the Constitution."

However, Proposition 218 does not prohibit other tools available to local governments that accomplish water conservation. Examples of such tools include: restricting specific wasteful uses of water (e.g., hosing down a driveway to clear debris), water usage caps or rationing, or public disclosure of excessive water users.

The California Supreme Court subsequently denied requests by then California Attorney General Kamala Harris (representing the California State Water Resources Control Board) and local government interest organizations (Association of California Water Agencies, League of California Cities, and California State Association of Counties) to depublish the Capistrano decision. Despite the best efforts by the state's top lawyers and water experts to depublish the groundbreaking ruling, the California Supreme Court decision to keep it published meant the Capistrano decision can continue to be cited as precedent throughout California in other lawsuits involving the legality under Proposition 218 of tiered water rates charged by other local governments. The Capistrano decision is also considered a milestone in the debate over to what extent appellate court decisions in California should be published as precedent.

After the 2015 Capistrano decision, lawsuits were filed against other local agencies in California, alleging that their tiered water rate structures were unconstitutional under Proposition 218.

Lifeline Utility Rates for Low Income Customers 

Local agencies often provide financial assistance to low income customers in the form of lifeline utility rates. Some local agencies use existing taxpayer funds to finance lifeline utility rate programs. Other local agencies may use proceeds from voluntary donations or from a voter approved tax increase to finance lifeline utility rate programs.

Proposition 218 issues arise when a local agency seeks to finance lifeline utility rate programs by increasing utility fees and charges on other ratepayers without voter approval. Local agencies generally prefer to legally overcharge ratepayers to pay for lifeline utility rate programs because no voter approval would be required and because it would free up existing local agency funds that could be spent on other purposes. However, since property-related fees and charges are limited to the cost of providing the service to each parcel of property, Proposition 218 prohibits local agencies from overcharging utility customers for property-related services such as water, sewer, and refuse collection to pay for lifeline utility rate programs. The legal reasoning is similar to the reasoning applied to tiered water rates and the cost of service limitations under Proposition 218.

As with tiered water rates, Proposition 218 does not prohibit all lifeline utility rate programs by local agencies. Proposition 218 does not prohibit local agencies from using existing taxpayer funds to pay for lifeline utility rate programs much in the same manner that taxpayer funds are used to finance social and other government programs for those in need. Proposition 218 also does not prohibit local agencies from using voluntary donations or securing a voter approved tax increase to pay for lifeline utility rate programs. However, when local agencies overcharge other utility customers without voter approval to pay for lifeline utility rate programs, Proposition 218 does not allow this.

While lifeline utility rate programs are intended to protect low income individuals, many other utility customers who do not qualify for lifeline programs are adversely impacted by significant utility fee and charge increases by local agencies. If a local agency is not responsive to the needs of its customers and raises utility fees and charges too much, the local initiative power under Proposition 218 provides a remedy that can generally be used to reduce or repeal those utility fee and charge increases.

Voter Approval for New or Increased Property-Related Fees and Charges 

Voter approval is also required for certain new or increased property-related fees or charges. Except for fees or charges for sewer, water, or refuse collection services, no property related fee or charge may be imposed or increased unless and until that property-related fee or charge is submitted and approved by a majority vote of the property owners of the property subject to the property-related fee or charge or, at the option of the agency, by a two-thirds vote of the electorate residing in the affected area.

A property-related fee or charge election must be conducted not less than 45 days after the required public hearing. An agency is allowed to adopt procedures similar to those for increases in assessments in the conduct of property-related fee or charge elections. However, a property-related fee or charge election cannot be used to validate or override a property-related fee or charge otherwise prohibited under Proposition 218.

Property-related fees or charges for sewer, water, or refuse collection services are exempt from the voter approval requirement. Since the exemptions represent exceptions to a voter approval requirement, the election exemptions are strictly construed. Nevertheless, most property-related fees or charges fall within an election exemption as utility fees for water, sewer, or refuse collection services. Examples of new or increased property-related fees or charges that ordinarily require an election include stormwater fees or flood control fees.

Stormwater Drainage Fees and Charges 

One of the most significant issues under the Proposition 218 election requirement for property-related fees and charges is whether stormwater drainage fees and charges are exempt from the election requirement as either a fee for "water" or "sewer" service.

Many local agencies use existing revenues from their general fund to help finance stormwater programs. Some local agencies also use existing revenues from stormwater fees and charges imposed without voter approval before Proposition 218 became law when an election was not legally required at that time. However, legal issues arise under Proposition 218 when local agencies seek to raise revenues in the form of a new or increased stormwater fee or charge without voter approval.

In 2002, a California appellate court in Howard Jarvis Taxpayers Association v. City of Salinas, 98 Cal. App. 4th 1351 (June 2002) unanimously held that a stormwater drainage fee imposed on developed parcels of land was a "property-related" fee subject to Proposition 218, including the voter approval requirement thereunder.

Prior to the Salinas decision, the California Attorney General previously issued a formal written opinion in 1998 and concluded not only that storm drainage fees are "property-related" fees subject to Proposition 218, but also that the election exemptions for "sewer" and "water" services do not apply. Thus, the California Attorney General reached the same conclusions concerning stormwater drainage fees under Proposition 218 as the appellate court did in the Salinas case which was decided some four years later.

Concerning the issue whether the sewer or water service election exemptions applied, the City of Salinas argued that the court should rely on the commonly accepted meaning of "sewer," noting the broad dictionary definition of this word. The city also pointed to several code sections that described storm drains as a type of sewer. Yet, even an analysis of Proposition 218 in a League of California Cities publication before the November 1996 election made a distinction between storm drainage and sewer systems (and also water systems) in stating: "But, it appears that all fees and charges for water, sanitation, storm drainage, or sewer are included within the scope of the measure." This analysis was available to the public before the Proposition 218 election, and it came from an organization, the League of California Cities, that opposed Proposition 218.

The Howard Jarvis Taxpayers Association argued that the court should look beyond mere dictionary definitions of "sewer" to examine the legal meaning of the term in the specific context of how that term is used in Proposition 218. The Association also observed that numerous California statutes differentiated between storm drainage and sewerage systems, including a specific statute that legally authorizes many local governments to levy fees and charges for storm drainage or sewerage systems.

In resolving the appropriate standard of construction that should be applied in interpreting the scope of the election exemption for property-related fees under Proposition 218, the appellate court in the Salinas case stated: "We must keep in mind, however, the voters' intent that the constitutional provision be construed liberally to curb the rise in "excessive" taxes, assessments, and fees exacted by local governments without taxpayer consent. Accordingly, we are compelled to resort to the principle that exceptions to a general rule of an enactment must be strictly construed." Thus, since Proposition 218 constitutionally requires that its provisions be liberally construed to limit local government revenues and enhance taxpayer consent, an election exemption provision that would have the opposite effect of enhancing local government revenues and limiting taxpayer consent must be strictly construed. This conclusion is also consistent with the rule of interpretation that exceptions to the general rule of a law be strictly construed.

In applying the strict construction standard to the sewer service exemption, the appellate court construed the exemption to include only its narrower and more common meaning applicable to sanitary sewerage. Using similar reasoning, the appellate court also concluded that the stormwater drainage fee did not qualify under the water service exemption. The court noted that the "average voter would envision 'water service' as the supply of water for personal, household, and commercial use, not a system or program that monitors storm water for pollutants, carries it away, and discharges it into the nearby creeks, river, and ocean."

The City of Salinas subsequently petitioned the appellate court to rehear the Salinas case, but that petition was denied. Thereafter, the City of Salinas petitioned the California Supreme Court to review the Salinas case, but that petition was also denied.

Many local agencies, politicians, and environmental interest groups want stormwater drainage services to also be classified as a utility service in the same class as water, sanitary sewer, and refuse collection services that are exempt from a property-related fee election under Proposition 218. If, contrary to the Salinas decision, stormwater drainage services were classified as an election exempt service, local agencies would no longer need voter approval under Proposition 218 to impose new or increased stormwater drainage fees and charges. This not only would result in local agencies imposing many new or increased stormwater fees and charges, but also in significantly higher amounts than would have otherwise been imposed had voter approval been required.

SB 231 (2017) Statutory "Clarification" Regarding Stormwater Fees 

On February 2, 2017, then Senator Robert Hertzberg (Democrat-District 18-Van Nuys) introduced Senate Bill No. 231 (SB 231) which would redefine and expand, by statute, the constitutional "sewer service" election exemption under Proposition 218 as also applying to stormwater fees and charges.

SB 231 sought to "clarify" the California Constitution so that it would be easier for local agencies to impose fees and charges to pay for stormwater programs and services by also exempting stormwater fees and charges from the constitutional election requirement under Proposition 218. However, a prior 2002 published California appellate court decision (the Salinas case) made it clear that stormwater fees and charges are not exempt from the constitutional election requirement for property-related fees under Proposition 218 in stating: "We conclude that article XIII D [part of Prop. 218] required the City to subject the proposed storm drainage fee to a vote by the property owners or the voting residents of the affected area."

Jon Coupal, President of the Howard Jarvis Taxpayers Association, wrote that SB 231 is an end run around Proposition 218 in that it attempts to illegally rewrite a Prop. 218 constitutional election exemption applicable to sewer and water service with a mere statute to allow for stormwater to be included under the definition of "sewer," meaning that stormwater fees and charges would no longer be subject to a Proposition 218 election.

On October 6, 2017, SB 231 was signed by then Governor Brown and became a statute. The SB 231 statute became effective on January 1, 2018.  Notwithstanding the SB 231 statute, local agencies remain bound by the 2002 Salinas decision interpreting the constitutional language of Proposition 218.

Local Initiative Power to Reduce or Repeal Stormwater Fees and Charges 

The property-related fee or charge election requirement for stormwater fees and charges only applies to new or increased stormwater levies. Stormwater fees and charges existing before Proposition 218 became law are not subject to the property-related fee or charge election requirement so long as those property-related fees or charges are not increased by the local agency. However, existing (before Proposition 218 became law) stormwater fees and charges imposed without voter approval can generally be reduced or repealed by the voters using the local initiative power under Proposition 218, including the significantly reduced signature requirement thereunder.

In addition, if any new or increased stormwater fee or charge is imposed by a local government without complying with the election requirement under Proposition 218, such as by a local government relying on SB 231 (2017) to evade the constitutional election requirement for stormwater fees and charges, as a legislative remedy that fee or charge may also be reduced or repealed by the voters using the local initiative power under Proposition 218, including the significantly reduced signature requirement thereunder. This can be done as an alternative to, or concurrent with, any legal remedy for noncompliance with any applicable election requirement under Proposition 218.

After property owner or voter approval of a property-related fee or charge in an election, the local initiative power under Proposition 218 can also generally be used by the electorate to reduce or repeal a stormwater levy. An example of where such a local initiative may be appropriate involves election issues or controversies associated with a property owner election, particularly where the local agency adopted controversial election procedures.

Should a property-related fee or charge reduction or repeal initiative qualify for the ballot, the initiative election would be by the registered voters since the initiative power is a power applicable to the electors.

Property-Related Fee or Charge Election Procedures 

If a property-related fee or charge election is required, the local agency decides whether the election will be a property owner election requiring a majority vote or a two-thirds vote registered voter election. The California Supreme Court has ruled that property owner elections for property-related fees and charges are not subject to the voting secrecy provision in the California Constitution. Historically, the constitutional right to vote in secret did not apply to property owner elections. This was not altered by the passage of Proposition 218.

The California Legislature has enacted additional legal procedures relating to property-related fee or charge elections under Proposition 218. These procedures are mandatory and are in addition to any other procedures that may be adopted by the local agency. The new procedural requirements became legally operative on July 1, 2014.

If the agency submits the proposed property-related fee or charge for approval by a two-thirds vote of the registered voters residing in the affected area, the election must be conducted by the agency's elections official or his or her designee.

If the agency submits the proposed property-related fee or charge for approval by a majority vote of the property owners who will be subject to the fee or charge, then additional procedures apply and must be followed.

On the face of each envelope in which the notice of election and ballot are mailed, there must appear in substantially the following form the phrase "OFFICIAL BALLOT ENCLOSED" in no smaller than 16-point bold type. A local agency may additionally place the phrase "OFFICIAL BALLOT ENCLOSED" on the face of the envelope in a language or languages other than English. The ballot must include the agency's address for return of the ballot, the date and location where the ballots will be tabulated, and a place where the person returning it may indicate his or her name, a reasonable identification of the parcel, and his or her support or opposition to the proposed property-related fee or charge. The ballots must be tabulated in a location accessible to the public. The ballot must be in a form that conceals its contents once it is sealed by the person submitting it. The ballot must remain sealed until the ballot tabulation starts.

An impartial person designated by the agency who does not have a vested interest in the outcome of the proposed property-related fee or charge must tabulate the ballots. An impartial person includes, but is not limited to, the clerk of the agency. If the agency uses agency personnel for the ballot tabulation, or if the agency contracts with a vendor for the ballot tabulation and the vendor or its affiliates participated in the research, design, engineering, public education, or promotion of the property-related fee or charge, the ballots must be unsealed and tabulated in public view to permit all interested persons to meaningfully monitor the accuracy of the ballot tabulation process.

The ballot tabulation may be continued to a different time or different location accessible to the public, provided that the time and location are announced at the location at which the tabulation started and is posted by the agency in a location accessible to the public. The impartial person may use technological methods to tabulate the ballots, including, but not limited to, punchcard or optically readable (bar-coded) ballots. During and after the tabulation, the ballots are treated as public records subject to public disclosure under the California Public Records Act, and must be made available for inspection by any interested person. The ballots must be preserved for a minimum of two years, after which they may be destroyed as provided by law.

Local Agency Burden to Demonstrate Compliance 

Prior to Proposition 218, the courts allowed local agencies significant flexibility in determining fee or charge amounts. In lawsuits challenging fees or charges, the challenger generally had the burden to show that they were not legal. However, Proposition 218 shifted the burden of demonstrating compliance to the local agency in any lawsuit challenging a property-related fee or charge. In any legal action contesting the validity of a property-related fee or charge, the burden is on the local agency to demonstrate compliance with the procedures and requirements applicable to property-related fees and charges. This change in the law makes it significantly easier for taxpayers to win a legal challenge involving a property-related fee or charge under Proposition 218.

The independent standard of review for property assessments adopted by the California Supreme Court in the landmark Silicon Valley Taxpayers case also applies to legal challenges involving property-related fees and charges. As a result, California courts now exercise their independent judgment in determining whether a property-related fee or charge violates Proposition 218. The independent standard of review makes it significantly easier for taxpayers to win legal challenges involving property-related fees and charges.

Application to Regional Levies 

Proposition 218 expressly applies to regional governments in California under its broad "local government" constitutional definition. This means that regional governments must comply with the voter approval requirements for taxes as well as the procedures and requirements applicable to special assessments and property-related fees and charges.

Regional government can also take the form of delivering government services and programs from the state level down to the regional level. An example would be a state administered water program limited to the Central Valley region of California. If a separate regional governmental agency is involved, the agency will generally be subject to Proposition 218. However, when a separate regional governmental agency is not involved, it is unclear whether Proposition 218 compliance is required as California courts have yet to resolve this issue.

There is a growing trend in California to address public policy issues on a regional basis. From the perspective of taxpayers and voters voting on a regional governmental levy (such as a regional tax or a regional property-related fee or charge), significant accountability concerns can arise. Depending upon the laws creating a regional governmental agency, the governing body may not be directly elected by the voters of the region. In many instances, the governing body members of a regional governmental agency are appointed.

If the governing body of a regional governmental agency is not directly elected by voters of the region, political accountability issues often arise regarding the expenditure of public funds derived from a regional governmental levy. In addition, if the governing body members of a regional governmental agency are not directly elected, the recall power is also not available to remove those members from the regional governing body. In the foregoing situation, if any expenditure problems were to occur after approval of a regional governmental levy, voters would not be able to vote any problem governing body members out of office as a political accountability mechanism.

As an accountability mechanism, a regional governmental levy can generally be reduced or repealed using the local initiative power under Proposition 218, including the significantly reduced signature requirement thereunder. However, even with the significantly reduced signature requirement, qualifying an initiative for a regional levy will generally be more difficult because of the large number of voters involved.

Application to State Levies 

Levies imposed by the State of California are generally not subject to Proposition 218 because the state is not a "local government" under Article XIII C or an "agency" under Article XIII D.

While state taxes are not subject to Proposition 218, such taxes are generally subject to approval by two-thirds of all members of the California Legislature. The preceding requirement for state taxes was adopted when Proposition 13 was approved by California voters in 1978. Proposition 26, approved by California voters in 2010, added a broad constitutional definition of "tax" applicable to the state with the resulting effect of expanding the scope of state levies subject to two-thirds approval by the California Legislature.

Special assessments on real property as well as property-related fees and charges are generally not levied by the state. To the extent such levies may be imposed by the State of California, whether two-thirds legislative approval is required is determined by the provisions of Proposition 26 approved in 2010.

However, there may exist limited instances in which levies imposed by the State of California might be subject to Proposition 218. Under Proposition 218, the definition of a "special district" refers to "an agency of the State, formed pursuant to general law or a special act, for the local performance of governmental or proprietary functions with limited geographic boundaries." Accordingly, some state agencies are subject to Proposition 218 when they are a "special district." While a state agency imposing a levy at the state level is not a "special district," such an agency may be a "local or regional governmental entity" under the broad definition of a "local government," and thereby be subject to Proposition 218 if the levy is imposed within limited geographic boundaries as opposed to being imposed on a statewide basis.

An example is a state levy imposed solely within the Central Valley region of California. Another example is a state levy imposed solely within the boundaries of a local agency in situations where the state has taken partial or complete control over the local agency and is exercising powers ordinarily exercised by the local agency.

Article XIII D Application to the State 

Under Proposition 218, any real property within an assessment district that is owned or used by the State of California is generally not exempt from assessment. As a result, the State of California must pay its fair share of any special assessment on real property lawfully levied pursuant to Proposition 218. The State of California is also entitled to vote in assessment ballot proceedings required by Proposition 218.

The State of California is also entitled to Proposition 218 protections applicable to property-related fees and charges. This includes rights to receive written notice and protest a property-related fee or charge, the five requirement safeguards applicable to property-related fees and charges (including "cost of service" protections), and the right to vote if a property owner election is held for a property-related fee or charge.

The California Department of General Services is required to develop compliance standards in the State Administrative Manual to inform owners of state property in California of their duties and responsibilities under Proposition 218. Under the State Administrative Manual, all state agencies are required to determine that, with respect to state properties for which an assessment is levied by a local government, the applicable assessment district was properly constituted pursuant to law and that the requisite special benefit is present. If the assessment is valid, then the state agency which owns or controls the property must promptly pay its proportionate share of the assessment.

Liberal Interpretation Constitutional Command 

Section 5 of Proposition 218 contains a liberal interpretation provision constitutionally commanding that its provisions be "liberally construed to effectuate its purposes of limiting local government revenue and enhancing taxpayer consent." The liberal interpretation constitutional command is legally binding on all California courts (including the California Supreme Court) and judges, the California Legislature, government agencies, and government officials and employees in their interpretation and application of Proposition 218. The liberal interpretation constitutional command has positively affected the outcome of numerous Proposition 218 lawsuits when it has been properly applied by the courts as intended.

The importance and significance of the liberal interpretation constitutional command under Proposition 218 can be traced to prior adverse judicial interpretations of Proposition 13 strictly construing important provisions of that initiative measure to limit their application to local governments. In two leading cases in 1982, the California Supreme Court, headed by controversial Chief Justice Rose Bird, formulated and applied a special rule of interpretation applicable only to Proposition 13 that strictly construed the circumstances in which local governments must get two-thirds voter approval to approve local tax increases. This special rule of interpretation was not consistent with the usual interpretation of initiative measures, and has not been applied by the California Supreme Court in circumstances other than Proposition 13 where a supermajority vote is required in an initiative measure. 

As a result of the two-thirds voter approval requirement for local taxes under Proposition 13 being strictly construed, local governments in California were able to impose many local tax increases with either simple majority voter approval or no voter approval at all. The resulting adverse impacts frustrated the effective tax relief provisions of Proposition 13 to the significant detriment of California taxpayers, especially homeowners. The special strict construction rule of interpretation also provided a legal basis for California courts to significantly limit the circumstances in which nontax levies such as special assessments, fees, and charges were special taxes subject to two-thirds voter approval under Proposition 13.

Reaction to Proposition 218 by Local Governments 

Proposition 218 significantly limits the ability of local governments to raise revenues without voter approval. As a result, most local governments in California opposed Proposition 218 when it appeared on the ballot, and continue to remain hostile to Proposition 218. In nearly every Proposition 218 appellate court case of significance, local government interests, including the League of California Cities, the California State Association of Counties, and the Association of California Water Agencies have sought to limit the scope and application of Proposition 218 restrictions by arguing in favor of narrow or strict interpretations of the taxpayer protections.

The actions by local governments to limit the scope and application of Proposition 218 are not limited to the courts. Through the legislative process, particularly in the California Legislature but also via the ballot initiative process, local governments have also supported legislative proposals that limit or otherwise erode Proposition 218 taxpayer protections. California law allows local governments to spend taxpayer funds to lobby in support of such legislative proposals in the California Legislature either directly or indirectly through local government interest associations such as the League of California Cities, the California State Association of Counties, and the Association of California Water Agencies.

References

External links 
Understanding Proposition 218 from the California Legislative Analyst's Office
Howard Jarvis Taxpayers Association analysis

218
1996
Initiatives in the United States
Property taxes
Taxation in California
Politics of California
Legal history of California
Economic history of California
Local taxation in the United States